= Philodemic Society =

Debating society of Georgetown University

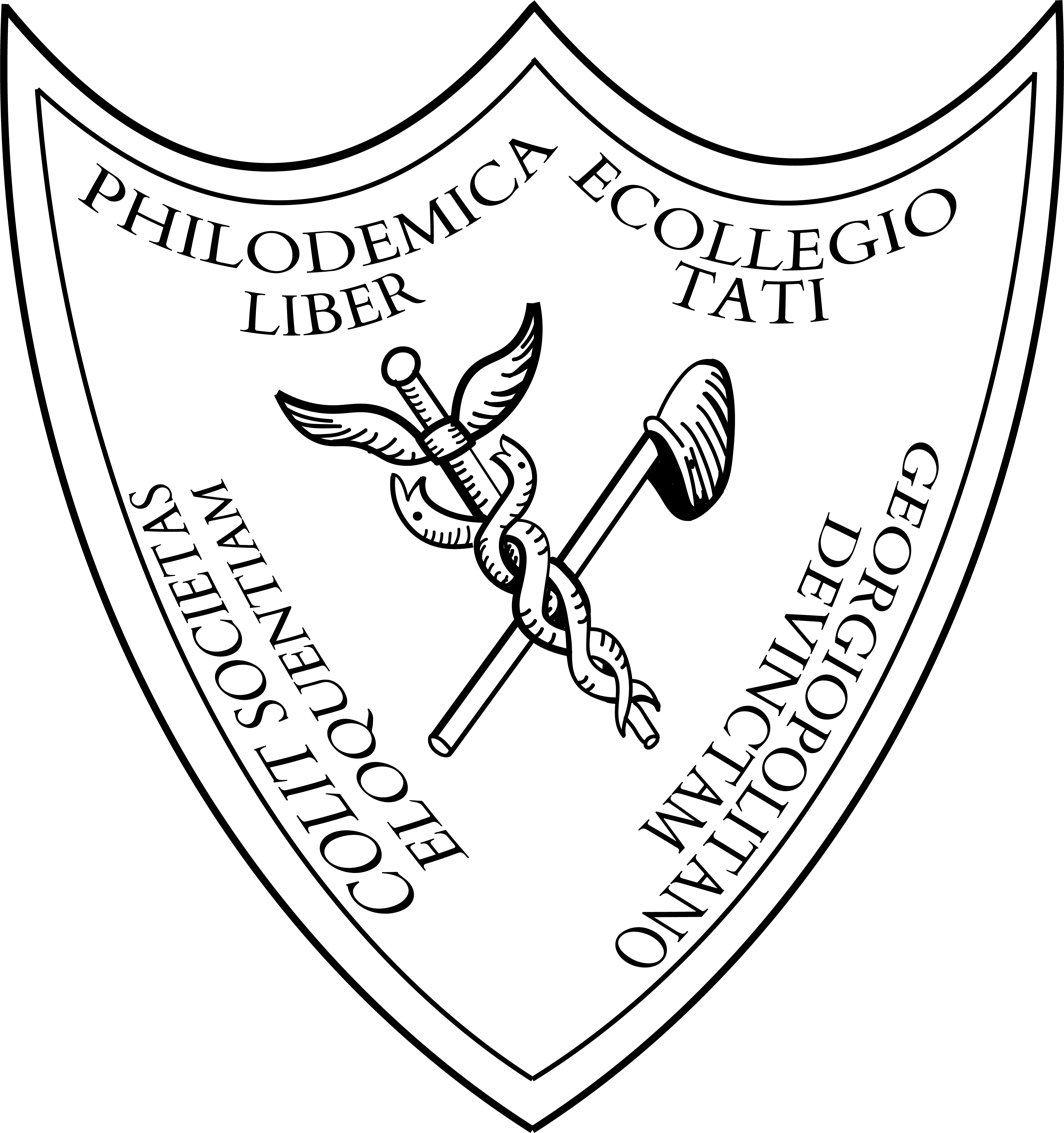
- Founded: September 25, 1830; 196 years ago Georgetown University
- Type: Literary
- Affiliation: Independent
- Status: Active
- Emphasis: Debate
- Scope: Local
- Motto: "Eloquence in Defense of Liberty"
- Chapters: 1
- Members: 60 to 90 (Note: Membership generally fluctuates from roughly 60 members at the beginning of each academic year to roughly 90 at the end.) active
- Headquarters: Washington, D.C. United States
- Website: philodemicsociety.org

The Philodemic Society is a student debating society at Georgetown University founded in 1830 by Father James Ryder, S.J. The Philodemic is among the oldest such societies in the United States, and is the oldest secular student organization at Georgetown. The society's motto, "Eloquentiam Libertati Devinctam" reminds its members that they are pursuing Eloquence in Defense of Liberty.

Debates are held weekly on Thursdays at 8 p.m. in the Philodemic Room in Healy Hall. In recent years, the Philodemic has taken a more active role in engaging other prominent debating societies on the Eastern seaboard. The Philodemic maintains several intercollegiate friendships, most notably with the Demosthenian Literary Society of the University of Georgia, the Dialectic and Philanthropic Societies of University of North Carolina at Chapel Hill, and the Jefferson Literary and Debating Society at the University of Virginia.

== History ==
In 1830, students under the leadership of Father James A. Ryder, S.J., later elevated to university president, founded the Philodemic Society. The only other student group at that time was a religious group, the Sodality of Our Lady. The society's first debate was on the topic of "Napoleon Bonaparte or General Washington: Which was the better man?" Though a secular society, the Philodemic often recognized Georgetown's Catholic traditions, and beginning in 1841, added an official commemoration of the Jesuit landing at St. Mary's City, Maryland, to their calendar.

Several other groups were founded in its shadow. Founded in 1839 as Georgetown's second debate society, the Philonomosian Debating Society became the second largest debating society around 1912–1913 when demand for membership in both the Philonomosian and Philodemic Societies could not accommodate both lower and upper classmen. After this point in time, both Societies became exclusively upperclassmen and membership was capped at 40. This Society held its own special cup called the Philonomosian cup and debated regularly like the Philodemic until it was disbanded in 1935. In 1912 the White Debating Society was founded in honor of Supreme Court Justice Edward Douglass White Jr., a former Philodemician. This society functioned as one of the junior debate societies on campus whose purpose was to train underclassmen that would be recruited by the more senior societies on campus. The strength of this society lay in its concentration of extemporaneous speaking. The Gaston Debating Society was founded in 1913 as Georgetown's second junior debate society for underclassmen. The motto of this society was, "advancing ourselves in love of knowledge and truth, and to make progress in eloquence". In recent years, membership has generally fluctuated between 60 and 90 members throughout the year, as roughly 20–30 members are inducted during the academic year and roughly the same number of senior members graduate each spring.

Since 1881, with the construction of Healy Hall by Paul J. Pelz under the direction of University president Patrick Healy two years prior, the Philodemic has been headquartered in a debating hall on the second floor of Healy, specially designed for the Philodemic. The Philodemic Room is directly adjacent to the president's office and includes a president's chair designed by Pelz himself. In the 1990s, the Philodemic was not permitted to access the room for a number of years, with the room being utilized as a conference room. During this time period, debates were held in other campus venues, and even once in the hallway outside the Philodemic Room. The Society also holds certain special debates, such as the annual humorous Christmas debate, in historic Riggs Library, also in Healy Hall.

Although since its refounding in 1989, the Philodemic no longer participates in competitive intercollegiate policy or parliamentary debate, historically, the Philodemic was a powerhouse of intercollegiate debating. In 1895, the Philodemic journeyed to Boston College to participate with Boston College's Fulton Society in the first ever debating competition between two Catholic schools. The Philodemic's prowess was such that for an 18-year period, from 1921 to 1939, Philodemic teams were undefeated in any intercollegiate competition.

The Society operates a Philodemic Library, and members are encouraged to donate works. With the advent of the digital age, the Society seeks to digitize the 185 years' worth of Philodemic archives and records that currently are kept in the Special Collections Office of Lauinger Library.

== Debates ==
In order to become a member of the Philodemic Society, a Georgetown undergraduate student must give three unscripted floor speeches over the course of one semester or four speeches over the course of two or more semesters. Each undergraduate on the Induction List is assigned a mentor from within the Society to familiarize him or her with the traditions, practices and rules of the Philodemic and assist in the preparation of an induction keynote. The Philodemic Society maintains a formal dress code for all their debates. Proper attire for weekly debates is "Western Business Attire." Every Thursday, after the debate, the Society journeys to Martin's Tavern on Wisconsin Avenue to continue the discussion.

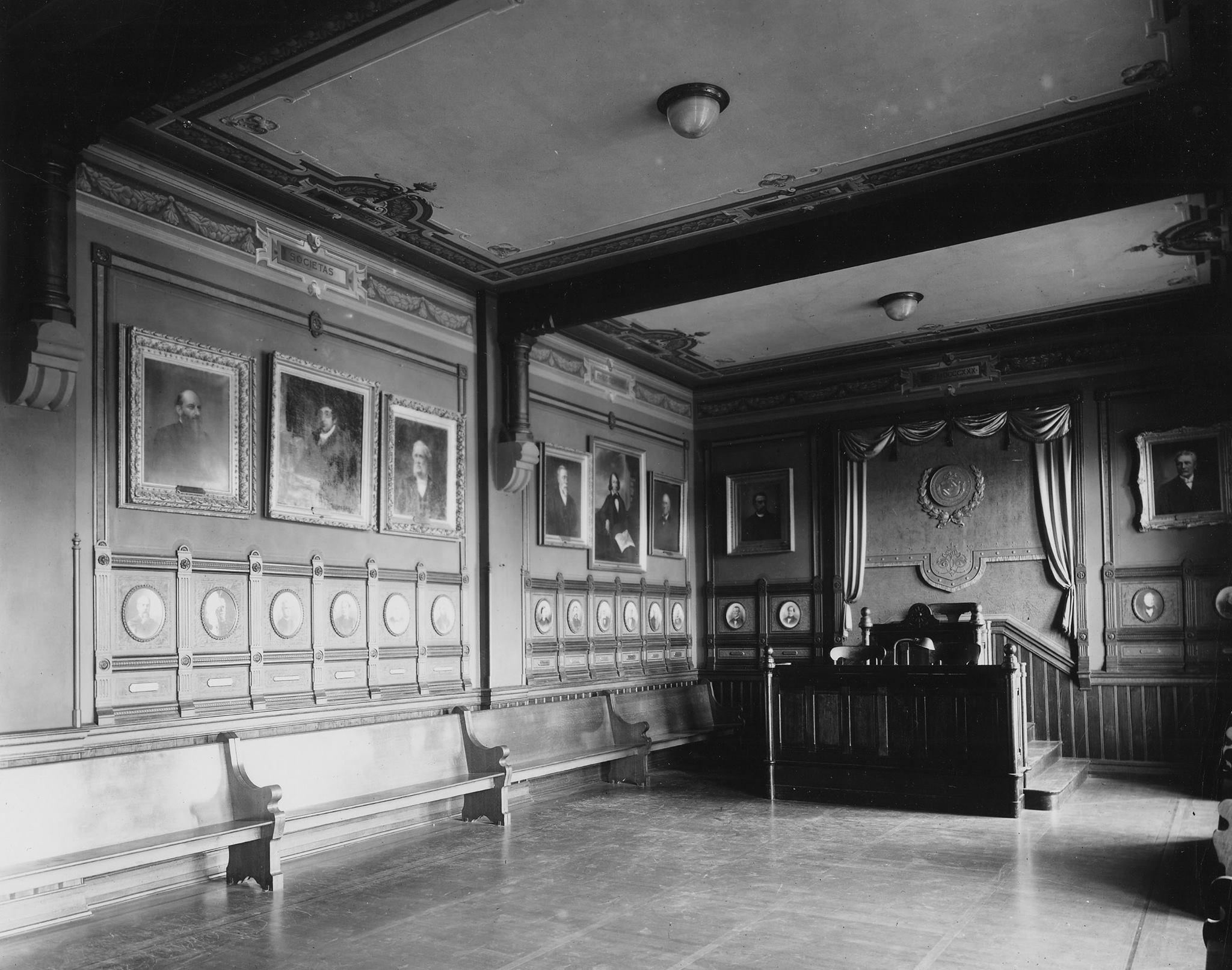
The Philodemic Society Room in Healy Hall in 1910

=== Weekly debates ===
Two keynote speeches are given at the start of each debate, one speaker on the affirmation and the other in the negation of a resolution that had been previously selected by the Society at a Business Meeting. The number of keynotes may be doubled for the purposes of inducting new members into the Society. Much of the fall semester contains debates with four keynotes as many new members are inducted into the Society during this part of the year. The keynoters give prepared speeches for the purposes of laying the groundwork for the Debate and outlining the most relevant and pertinent arguments that are meant to be expounded upon by the Society at large during the following floor debate. Once the keynoters have finished making their remarks, the president reads the house rules, and opens the floor to the Debate.

The Philodemic room is divided in two—with the negation and affirmation sitting on opposite sides of the room. The president calls on speakers, alternating speakers between those speaking on behalf of the affirmation and those speaking on the side of the negation. Floor speeches are relatively short—under three minutes—and are meant to be an unprepared address that anyone in attendance may give at a moments notice. Little or no preparation is intended for these speeches as members and non-members alike are encouraged to use these opportunities to hone their speech giving skills and quick thinking abilities by giving on-the-fly, pertinent and sometimes, dramatic speeches.

Preference is given to Society members in order of seniority. Presidents discretion may call for a non-members' speaking time during which the President will only call on non-member undergraduate speakers. This is usually when non-member undergraduates attain their three or four speeches. After several rounds of floor speeches that last for about one hour, the keynoters are invited back to give their closing remarks. Once they are finished, the President divides the room, and the keynoters physically count the people that are standing on their side of the room. Abstentions stand in the middle between to the two sides.

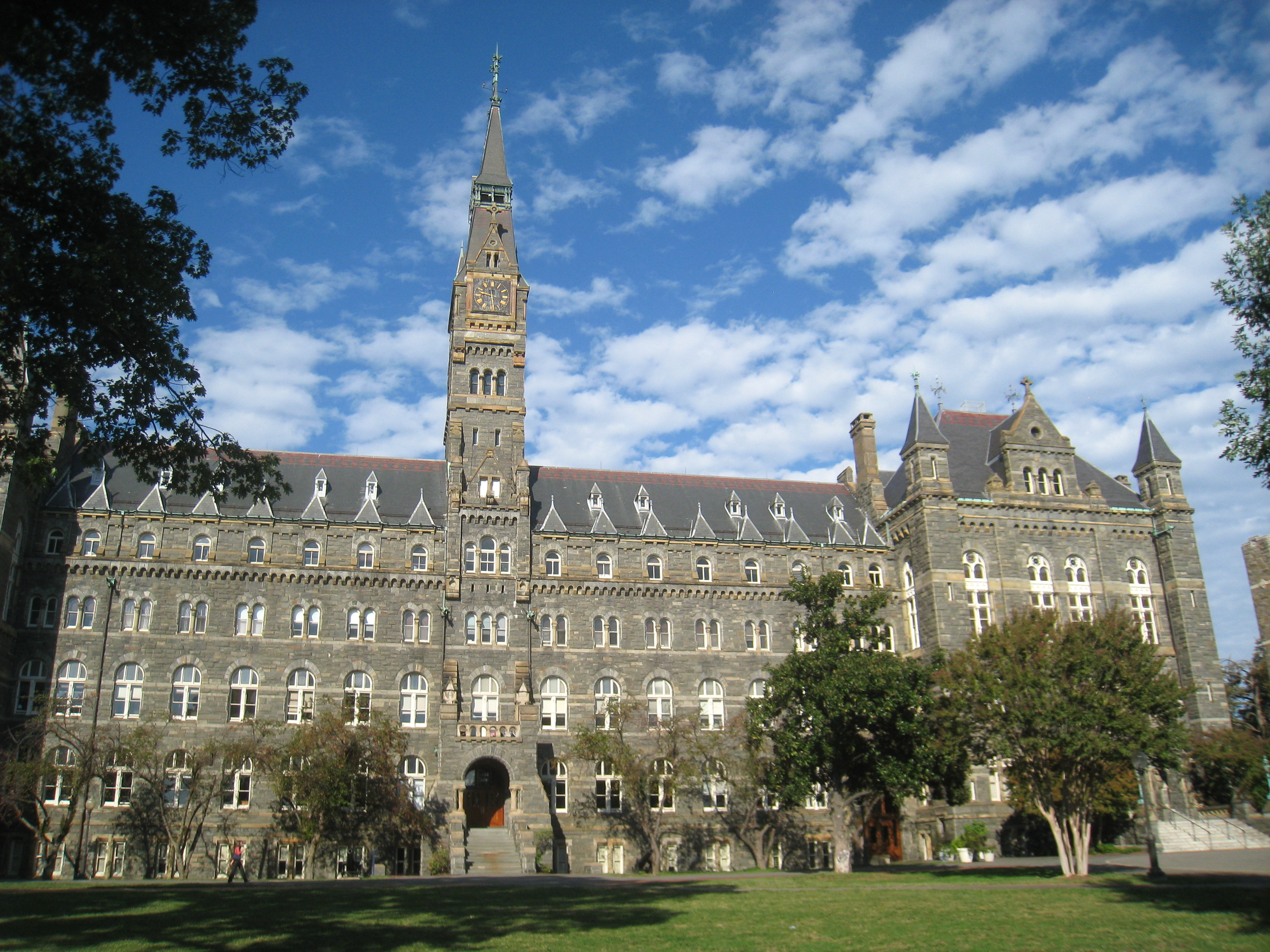
The Philodemic Society Room is located on the second floor of Healy Hall.

=== The Hamilton Homecoming Debate ===
Every year, early in the fall semester, the Philodemic holds the annual Hamilton Homecoming Debate that invites alumni of the Society to return to campus. It gives them a chance to reconnect with friends and see how the Society has progressed as an organization since leaving campus. It is also an opportunity for members of the Society to network with graduated peers.

=== The Dean Gordon Debate ===
The Dean Gordon Debate stands out among debates as one night where the members of the Society collectively agree to forgo the normal rules of formality, poise and decency usually expected at Debates. Held in April each year, this debate reveals a side of the Philodemic usually seen only outside the austerity of the Philodemic Room.

Unlike the Society's regular debates, the Dean Gordon Debate uses a less formal and more humorous format. Members debate a lighthearted resolution using wit and wordplay. The Dean Gordon Cup is awarded to the speaker judged to have used wit most effectively in persuasive speaking.

The Dean Gordon Debate is named after an Philodemician and Georgetown Alum, Richard Gordon, who, as associate and assistant dean of the law school, was instrumental in the refounding of the Philodemic in the 1990s. Dean Gordon, who died in 2004, was a former President of the Philodemic and the Merrick Medal winner in 1950.

=== The Richard T. Merrick Debate ===
Inaugurated in 1874, the Merrick Debate is the Society's most prestigious event of the year. The resolution is discussed and decided by the Society at length months beforehand to ensure that the debate is both relevant to the world today, and has deep roots in the western philosophical tradition on which the Society was founded. The Merrick Debate is the crowning end of the Philodemic season and is held every year in April.

The Society had held 144 Merrick Debates since the debate's inception. It is named after the noted 19th century lawyer Richard T. Merrick, who endowed the award and medal in 1874. The Merrick Debate generally occurs at midday; in the past, debates were often held in Georgetown's historic Gaston Hall, but are now generally held in the Philodemic Room or Riggs Library. On the evening of the debate, the Society holds a black tie celebration at a venue in Washington; in recent years, the Society has held the gala at locations including the National Press Club and the City Tavern Club.

Unlike the weekly debates in which there are two keynoters that are selected by seniority, the four Merrick keynoters are selected by the Society during a competitive spring season of debate. At the conclusion of spring Merrick debates, the Society votes on the best speakers of the night and the speakers who get the most votes are awarded Merrick points based on how many votes they received. The members with the top four most points at the end of the season become the four members that give keynotes at the Merrick Debate. Being selected to keynote the Merrick Debate is among the most impressive achievements one can attain within the Society.

The real debate is adjudicated by judges. These judges have came from various backgrounds, including politicians, civil rights leaders, journalists, to religious and military leaders. Among the judges in recent years have been E.J. Dionne, Patrick J. Conroy, Dan Lungren, Chai Feldblum, Thomas L. Ambro, Joseph Lhota and Albert Wynn. At the end of the debate, the judges choose the keynoter they believe best demonstrated "Eloquence in Defense of Liberty" and award him or her the Merrick Medal. This medal is the decoration a Georgetown student may wear during graduation that is not officially awarded at graduation. Altogether, the Merrick Debate is viewed by many as the epitome of what the Philodemic is as a debate society.

=== Intercollegiate Debate ===
In recent years, the Philodemic has attempted to resuscitate its long tradition of intercollegiate debate with the Annual East Coast Conference of Collegiate Literary Debate Societies, held in conjunction with a historical celebration known as Kai Yai Yai. The competition, which is usually known simply as "Kai Yai Yai", is held at the beginning of October and has in recent years included the Philomathean Society of the University of Pennsylvania, the American Whig–Cliosophic Society of Princeton University, the Dialectic and Philanthropic Societies of the University of North Carolina at Chapel Hill and the Demosthenian Literary Society of The University of Georgia in Athens. The Philodemic has historically participated in the Winchester Cup, an annual competition with the Jefferson Literary and Debating Society of the University of Virginia, and the Columbia Cup, a debate with the Enosinian Society of The George Washington University before they became defunct in 2010.

== Notable members ==
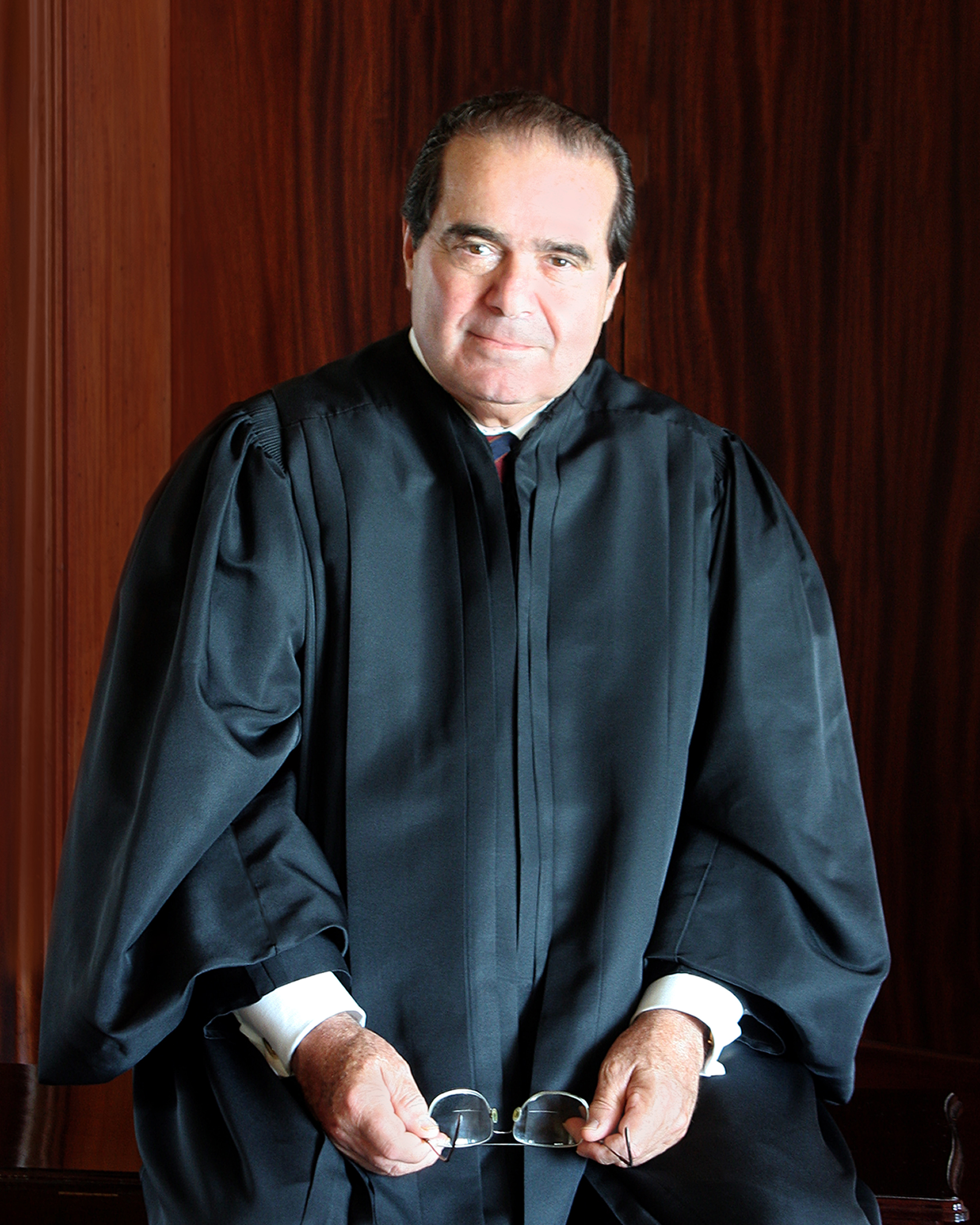
Associate Justice of the Supreme Court Antonin Scalia was a member of the Philodemic Society during the 1950s

- William Matthews Merrick (Class of 1831), Congressman from Maryland, Federal Judge
- Daniel Carroll Digges (Class of 1833), Maryland politician
- Alexander Dimitry, American diplomat, linguist and scholar; ambassador to Costa Rica and Nicaragua
- Charles Constantine Pise, first (and, to date, only) Roman Catholic Chaplain of the United States Senate
- Solomon Hillen Jr., Congressman from Maryland, Mayor of Baltimore
- Francis Kernan (Class of 1836), Senator from New York
- William Wing Loring, Officer in the United States Army, the Confederate Army, and Egyptian Army
- Georges-Casimir Dessaulles, (Class of 1848), Canadian senator
- Bernard G. Caulfield (Class of 1848), Congressman from Illinois
- Tomás Herrán (Class of 1863), Colombian diplomat, namesake of the Hay–Herrán Treaty of 1903
- Edward Douglass White (Class of 1863), 9th Chief Justice of the United States
- Stephen Russell Mallory, Jr. (Class of 1869), Senator and Representative from Florida
- Agustín de Iturbide y Green, Prince of Iturbide (Class of 1884), heir to the Mexican throne
- Condé Benoist Pallen (Class of 1880), Catholic editor and author
- Condé Montrose Nast (Class of 1894), noted magazine publisher
- Robert J. Collier (Class of 1894), editor of Collier's Weekly
- Philip Hart (Class of 1934), former Senator from Michigan
- Antonin Scalia (Class of 1957), Associate Justice of the U.S. Supreme Court
- Robert S. Bennett (Class of 1961), noted American attorney
- Robert Shrum (Class of 1965), noted political consultant
- Frank Keating (Class of 1966), 25th Governor of Oklahoma
- John G. Koeltl (Class of 1967), Judge of the United States District Court for the Southern District of New York
- Paul D. Clement (Class of 1988), 43rd U.S. Solicitor General
- Jeff Wall (Class of 1998), former U.S. Solicitor General
- Emma Green (Class of 2012), journalist

=== Honorary Philodemicians ===
Starting in 1831, the members of the Philodemic Society began electing honorary members and the electee would have to confirm his desire to become a member. "At that time and for years afterward it was considered a mark of especial distinction to be elected an honorary member of the society and some of the foremost men in public life at the national capital were so honored." Honorary members include George Washington Parke Custis, William Gaston, Ulysses S. Grant, James Hoban, Andrew Jackson, Robert E. Lee, Robert McClelland, Franklin Pierce, William Winston Seaton, John Hughes and Zachary Taylor.

== See also ==
Related

- Yale Debate Association
- Berkeley Forum
- Cambridge Union Society
- Oxford Union Society
- The Durham Union Society
- Conférence Olivaint
- Olivaint Conference of Belgium
- Debattierclub Stuttgart
- Queen's Debating Union

Other historic collegiate literary societies

- Philomathean Society of the University of Pennsylvania
- Philolexian Society of Columbia University
- American Whig–Cliosophic Society of Princeton University
- The Washington Literary Society and Debating Union and Jefferson Literary and Debating Society of the University of Virginia
- Union-Philanthropic (Literary) Society of Hampden–Sydney College
- Dialectic and Philanthropic Societies of the University of North Carolina
- Demosthenian Literary Society of the University of Georgia
- Clariosophic Society and the Philomathic Literary Society of the University of South Carolina
- Yale Political Union of Yale University
- Peucinian Society of Bowdoin College
