= William Pitt Debating Union =

Debating society at University of Pittsburgh, United States

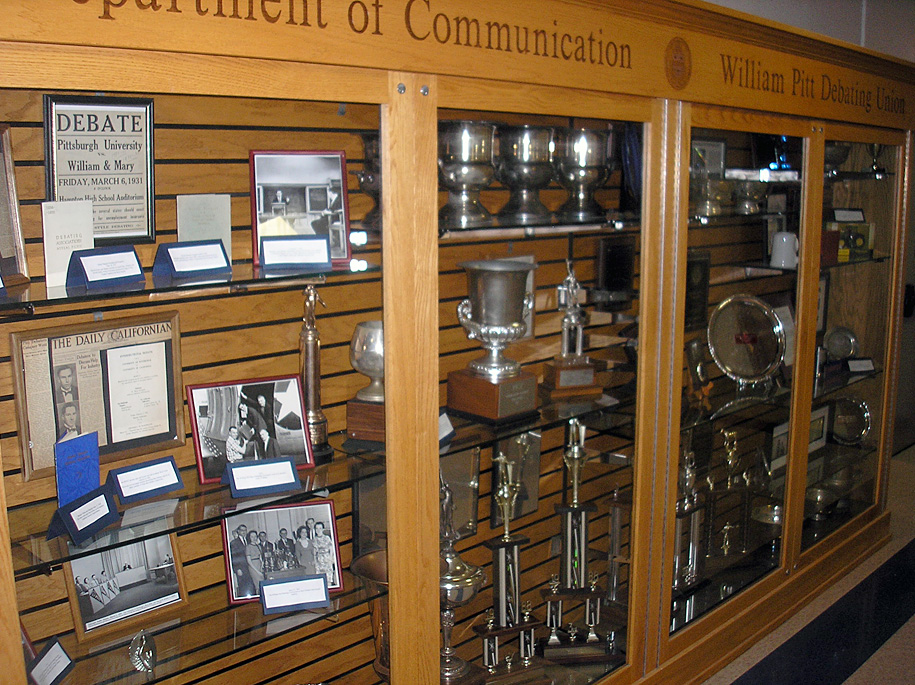
Trophy case of the William Pitt Debating Union, in the University of Pittsburgh Department of Communication, seen here on the former eleventh floor location (now 14th floor) of the Cathedral of Learning

The William Pitt Debating Union (WPDU) is the debating society of the University of Pittsburgh. Falling under the auspices of the Department of Communication, the WPDU is a co-curricular program and hub for a wide range of debating activities, including intercollegiate Lincoln-Douglas debate, public debate, collegiate forensics, and debate outreach. One of the oldest collegiate debating organizations in the nation, the WPDU grew from the University’s Division of Public Speaking in 1912. Throughout its history, the WPDU has regularly participated in national and international competitions, including capturing the affirmative team two-man debate national championship at the 1947 Grand National Forensic Tournament, and appearing 45 times at the National Debate Tournament (through 2019), where it captured the 1981 national championship. Now, the team competes in the National Forensics Association in NFA-LD debate and various speech events. The WPDU is located in the heart Pitt's campus and is housed on the fourteenth floor of the Cathedral of Learning. The WPDU also offers scholarships to top team participants.

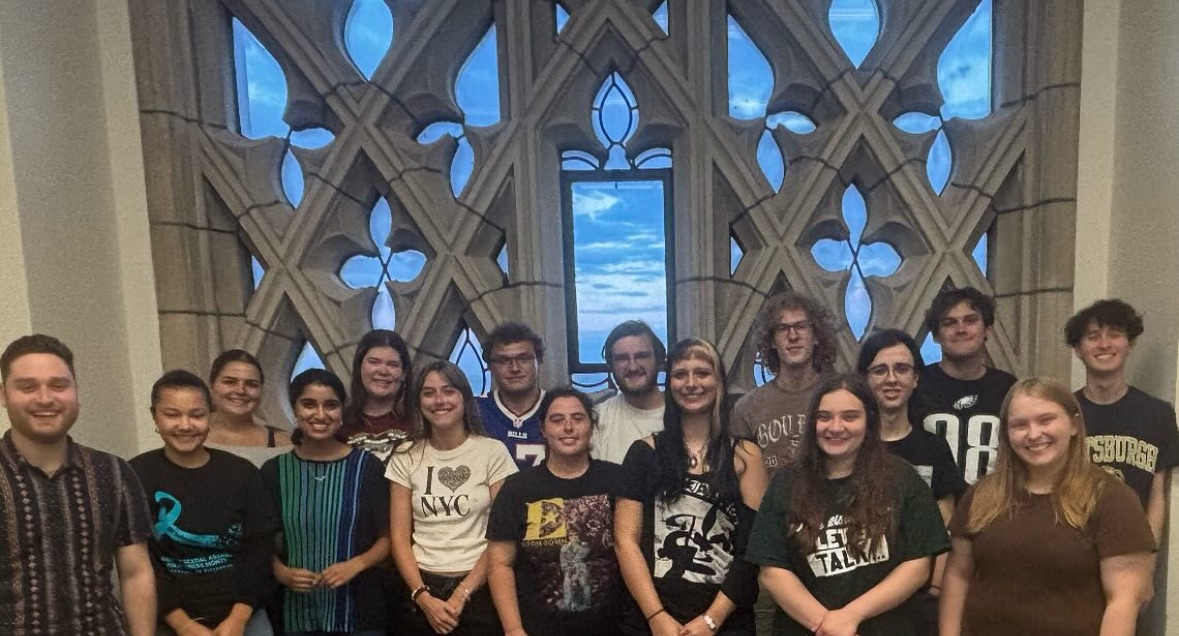
Taken in the Cathedral of Learning -- a whole new class of members!

== Competitions ==
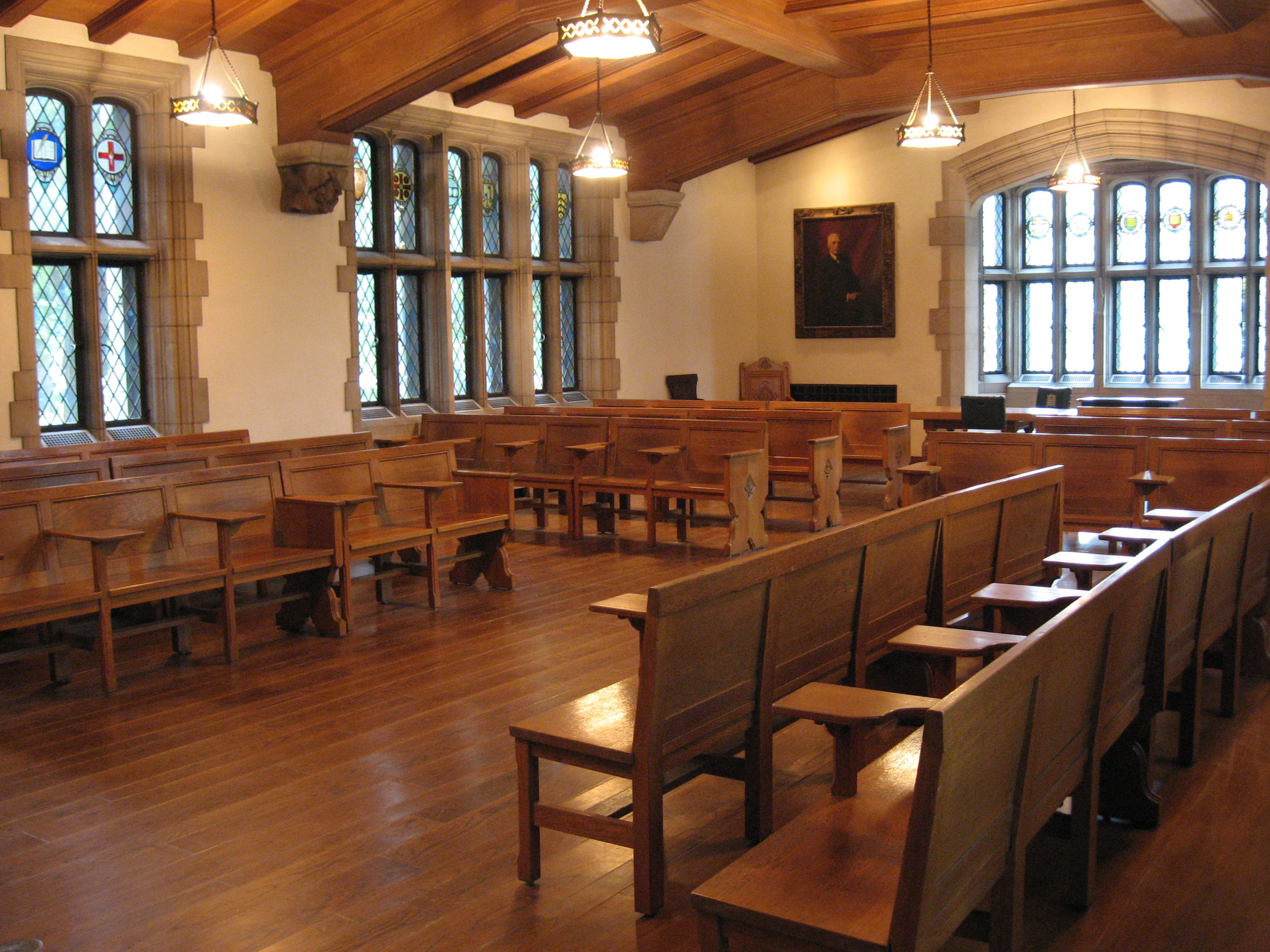
The English Nationality Room is one venue sometimes utilized for debates

The WPDU has participated in, and traveled extensively to intercollegiate debate competitions since its early history. A regular participant regional and national competitions, the WPDU has previously won the Pennsylvania State Debating Championship, qualified for the National Debate Tournament forty-five times, and captured the 1981 National Debate Tournament national championship. In addition, at the 1947 Grand National Forensic Tournament, a two-man affirmative debate team won the national championship competing against 89 other teams, while Pitt's negative team finished as runners-up. The WPDU has also finished first in the American Debate Association’s varsity rankings and its debaters have won hundreds of individual speaking awards, including 2nd place at the 2025 NFA National Tournament in Lincoln-Douglas debate. In the past the WPDU hosted major intercollegiate debating competitions, and through the years, the team has appeared on television, including once hosting its own weekly television show in the 1950s, and its success has enjoyed coverage in local and regional media. During the 2024-25 season, the union took 5th place in the nation in Lincoln-Douglas debate at the National Forensics Association's National Tournament, in addition to qualifying over a dozen students.

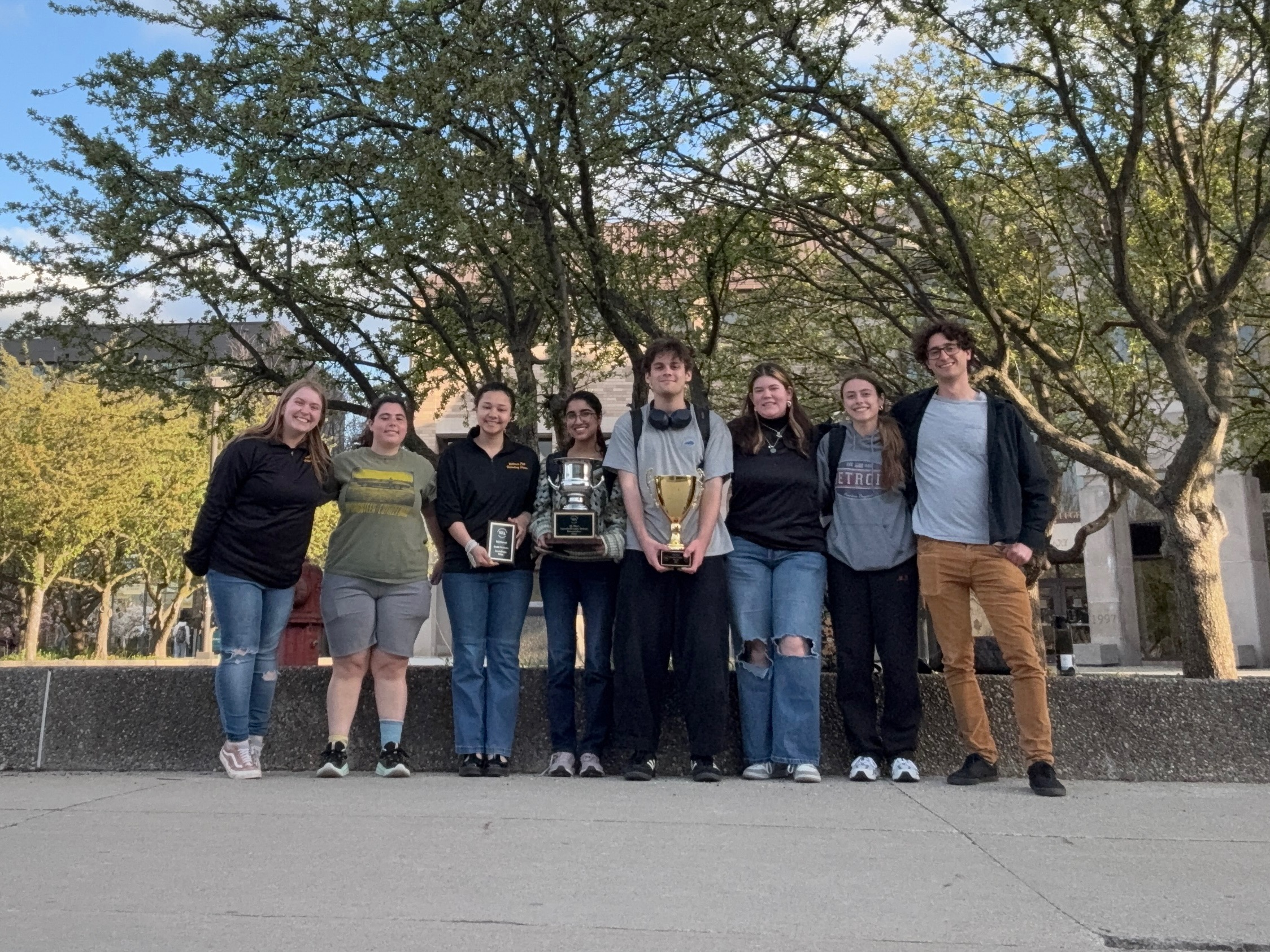
Team poses after taking 2nd place in NFA-LD debate and 5th team overall

== Public Debate ==
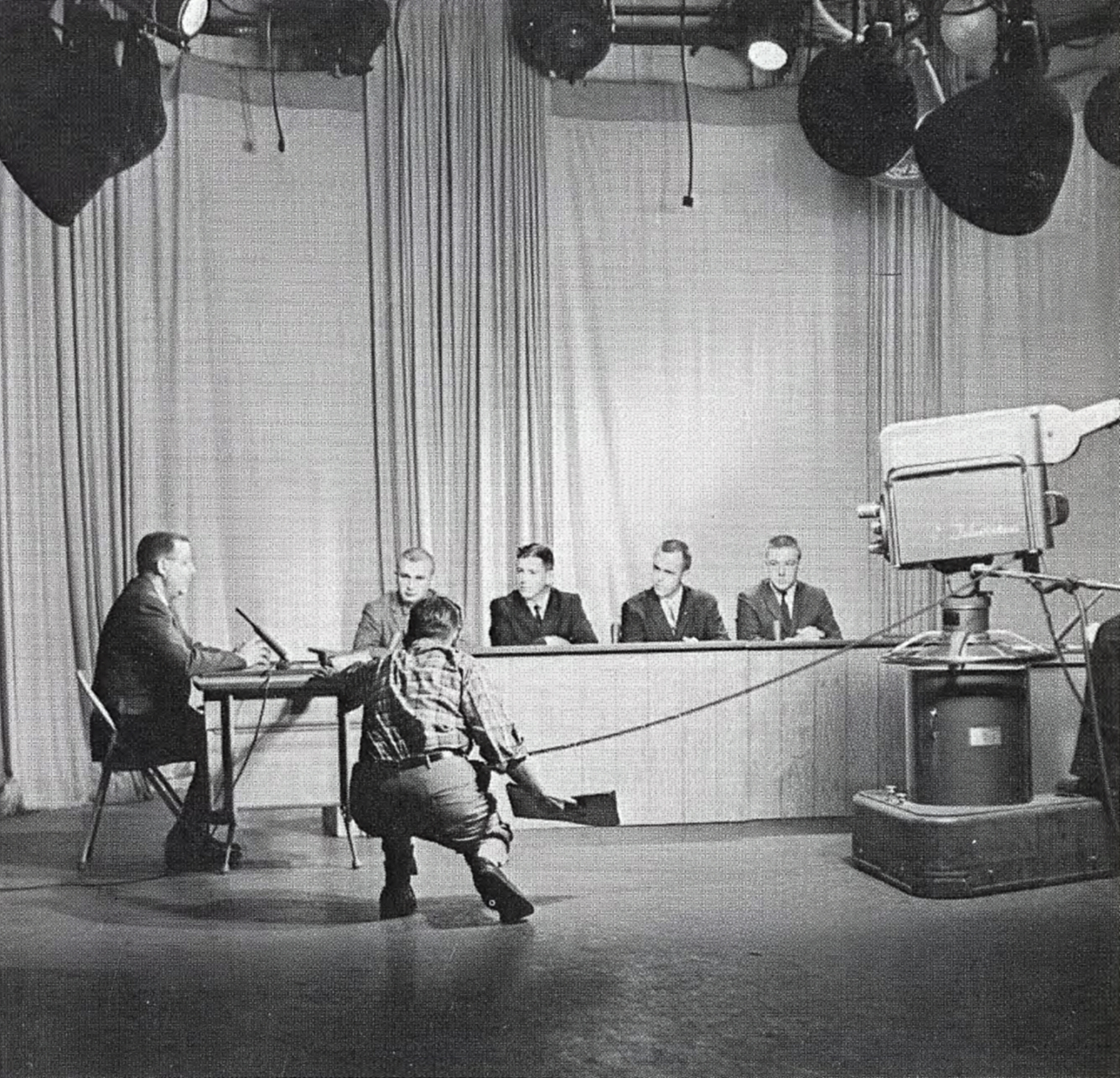
On set of Face the People, WPDU's weekly television show broadcast during the late 1950s and early 1960s on WQED

Throughout its history, the WPDU has frequently convened public debates on salient and pressing topics facing local, regional and national communities, sometimes drawing large crowds and media attention. Today, these debates typically feature a mix of student and expert advocates, audience participation periods, and formats tailored specifically for each debate. Topics have included school vouchers, the merging local governments, and transportation issues, peer-to-peer file sharing, textbook pricing, and sex education. In 2000, the Cross Examination Debate Association recognized the Union’s public debate efforts with the Public Sphere Award. Currently, the union hosts an annual series called the Marcella L. Finegold Debate Series with a different academic theme each year; debates and lectures in this series range from team showcases to intercollegiate debates judged by public audiences.

== International Debate ==
The Union regularly hosts foreign national teams on their debating tours of the United States, having entertained the British, Japanese, Russian and Irish national teams, and has also traveled for international debates. In 2000, the WPDU hosted a public debate between the national high school select teams from New Zealand and South Africa. From 2001-2006, WPDU coaches worked with the U.S. State Department to teach the public debate process as a strategy of civil society empowerment to high school students from Albania, Kosovo, Serbia, Romania, Macedonia and Montenegro.

== Outreach ==
The WPDU has a long history of outreach exemplified by its history of hosting high school debate clinics and tournaments as far back as at least the 1930s. Since 1995, the WPDU has reached thousands of elementary and secondary school students through its outreach initiatives, including the College in High School Argument program and the Middle School Public Debate Program. Today, many members of the WPDU also coach local middle and high school speech and debate programs.

== Speech ==
In 2023, under new director Dr. Al Primack, the William Pitt Debating Union expanded their team to include collegiately competitive forensics. This addition broadened the horizons and competitiveness for the union, qualifying students for NFA's National Tournament every year since its creation. In the 2025-26 season, the team has expanded from limited preparation and platform events to also include interpretative events; they now cover the full scale of speech events offered by the National Forensics Association.

== Coaches ==
Former Directors of Debate
Robert P. Newman - 1952 to 1967
Thomas Kane - 1967 to 1990
Arnie Madsen - 1990 to 1994
Gordon Mitchell, 1995-2007
Shanara Reid-Brinkley, 2007-2015

Alvin Primack, 2023-present

Former Coaches
Matt Brigham, Matt Gayetsky, Taylor Hahn, Amber Kelsie, Odile Hobeika, Joseph Packer, Sydney Pasquinelli, John Rief, Brent Saindon

== Contact ==
If you wish to contact the William Pitt Debating Union for press inquiries, team questions, or interests in joining, please visit our website for more information. To follow the team on social media, follow @wpdu.pitt on Instagram. If you are interested in donating to the WPDU, click here.

== Related ==
- (United Kingdom) : Cambridge Union Society
- (United Kingdom) : Oxford Union Society
- (United Kingdom) : The Durham Union Society
- (United Kingdom) : London School of Economics, Grimshaw International Relations Club
- (United States) : Yale Debate Association
- (United States) : Berkeley Forum
- (France) : Olivaint Conférence
- : Olivaint Conference of Belgium
- (Germany) : Debattierclub Stuttgart
- (Hungary) : Common Sense Society Budapest
- (Canada) : Queen's Debating Union
