= Queen's Debating Union =

Canadian collegiate debating society

- Emblem of the QDU
- Formation: 1843
- Type: Student debating union
- Headquarters: Kingston
- Location(s): Queen's Athletics and Recreation Centre, 284 Earl St. Kingston, Ontario
- President: Annika Frankiss
- Affiliations: World Universities Debating Council, Canadian University Society for Intercollegiate Debate
- Website: www.queensdebatingunion.org

The Queen's Debating Union is the debating society of Queen's University in Kingston, Ontario, Canada. It was founded as Canada's first debating society in 1843 and became one of the four founding organisations of Canadian University Society for Intercollegiate Debate. It continues to be an active club on campus and has a strong presence both domestically and internationally as a competitive parliamentary debating club.

== History ==
Founded in 1843, the Queen's Debating Union (or QDU) is the oldest student organization at Queen's University and the oldest varsity debating organization in Canada. The Dialectic Society, the original form of the QDU, was responsible for founding in 1858 and initially administering the Alma Mater Society, the student government organization for the University. Later, the formerly all-male Dialectic Society joined with the Levana Debating Society, the club's all-female equivalent, to become the modern incarnation of the Queen's Debating Union.

Queen's debaters were highly involved in constructing and maintaining the first manifestations of inter-collegiate debate among Canadian institutions, in particular organizing a longstanding set of competitions with the University of Ottawa beginning at the turn of the twentieth century. The club was also responsible for establishing initial links with debating societies in the United States. A 1908 debate between teams from Queen's University and Bates College is believed to have been the first international collegiate debate to have taken place in North America.

== Activities ==
The Queen's Debating Union is a member of the Canadian University Society for Intercollegiate Debate (CUSID), a national organization which governs and represents university debating across the country. Members of the QDU travel both nationally and globally to participate in competitive varsity tournaments where a broad set of intellectual issues, from bioethics to international political economy, are discussed and debated. Canadian debate tournaments occur in two primary styles of debate. British Parliamentary and Canadian Parliamentary, which involve four and two pairs of debaters respectively, both emphasize a style of debate using a combination of facts and rhetoric to achieve persuasive argumentation.

These tournaments and opportunities give Queen's students the opportunity to increase their knowledge of current issues, foster their public speaking skills and enhance the ability to think on their feet. Members of the Queen's Debate Union have achieved notoriety at public speaking events across Canada. The club is also highly active on campus, organizing show debates, inviting guest speakers, and running a high school outreach program to teach local students about debating and public speaking.

== Tournaments ==
The Queen's Debating Union routinely hosts national and regional title tournaments as a member of CUSID, including the 2013 Women's National Championships, 2012 Leger Central Canadian Championships, the 2008 British Parliamentary Championship, 2017 Canadian Parliamentary National Championship, the 2020 Central Canadian Novice Debating Championship, the 2000, 2004 and 2016 North American Debating Championships as well as the 2018 North American University Debating Championship. The QDU also hosts two popular inter-varsity debate tournaments, the Queen's Chancellors Cup in British Parliamentary style and the Sutherland IV in Canadian Parliamentary style. The later is named for Robert Sutherland, an esteemed alumni of the Union.

In the spring, the QDU hosts the annual Queen's University High School Debating Championship, a well-known tournament that attracts hundreds of high school students from across Canada. In 2020, after many years as the most prominent high school Canadian Parliamentary tournament, the Union transitioned to hosting the tournament in British Parliamentary.

== Campus and community involvement ==
The QDU is a highly active club on the Queen's University campus and the wider Kingston community, participating in monthly show debates and providing two weekly meetings that are open to all interested students on campus.

The Debating Union is responsible for organizing many debate-related events on campus, including a highly publicized twentieth anniversary recreation of the famous 1988 Mulroney-Turner debate, and a public debate about surveillance of urban areas that was hosted with the local Agnes Etherington Art Centre.

The Debating Union also provides adjudicators each year to the highly prestigious Queen's Intercollegiate Business Competition. The club has strong ties with Alumni organizations like the Toronto Over 50 Group and publishes an annual newsletter for Alumni readers called 'The Mace'. It also provides debate training and support to the local Kingston Collegiate and Vocational Institute through its high school outreach program.

== Successes ==
The members of the Queen's Debating Union consistently attend dozens of tournaments every year, and have achieved many notable successes. Queen's team won Canadian Parliamentary National Championships in 1992, 2002, 2004, 2006, 2015, 2016, and 2023. The Union has won the National Debating Championship a total of six times, the second highest of any Canadian university debate society. Queen's also won the inaugural North American Debating Championship, in 1992. In 1993, Marc Givens of Queen's, part of the winning team the year before, won the top debater in the North American Debating Championship.

In 2003 two debaters from the QDU, Nicola Matthews and Michael Saposnik, were semi-finalists at the World Universities Debating Championship (WUDC), hosted by Hart House (University of Toronto). In 2004, Kevin Massie and Michael Saposnik were semi-finalists at the WUDC hosted by Nanyang University in Singapore. In 2006, Laura Kusisto (then QDU President) was the top speaker at the Canadian National Debating Championships. Laura and her partner, Adam Lazier (then QDU critic), were also finalists at the 2006 North American Championships. In 2009, Christine Wadsworth and Sheldon McCormick achieved octo-finalist status at the WUDC in Cork, Ireland. In 2010, Christine Wadsworth and Sheldon McCormick again achieved octo-finalist status at the Koc WUDC in Turkey. In 2013, Kaya Ellis and William Gibson achieved octo-finalist status at the Berlin World's Debating Championship.

In 2012, Jake Roth and Kate McNeil won the MacMaster Pro Am Tournament. Robert Embree and Tavish Logan were the champions of the Seagram Invitational. Julia Kirby and Michelle Polster won the Canadian National Championships in 2013, and Mitchell Dorbyk and Will Maidment were the National Novice Champions. Julia Kirby would return to Nationals the next year at McGill University to claim the top speaker title. in 2014 Julia Kirby and Aisha won the North American Women's Debating Championships, Julia would go on to make finals at the same tournament then next two years in a row. Julia Kirby and Julia Milden won the Canadian British Parliamentary Championships in 2015, as well as making semi finals at Yale, and winning the Huber IV. Mitchell Dorbyk and Tavish Logan would make the finals of both the Huber IV and Yale IV as well as making it to the semi finals at the Canadian BP championships in the same year. In 2016, Tavish Logan and Mitchell Dorbyk would go on to win Nationals and Colgate. Ksenia Podvoiskia and Betsy Studholme would then go on to win Nationals in 2017, keeping the trophy at Queen's for another year. Podvoiskia and Samantha Hargreaves would break at WUDC later that year in Mexico City, where they would finish as partial-double-octo-finalists. In 2018, Corey Davidson and Michael Didow won the Leger Cup. Davidson would go on to win the tournament again in 2020, this time alongside Jake Sullivan. In 2019, Addy Rawat won the Canadian British Parliamentary Championships hybriding alongside a member of the University of Western Ontario Debate Society. At the same tournament, the teams of Patrick Cowley and Corey Davidson as well as Jake Sullivan and Grace Li would be semi-finalists. In 2022, Diggory Waddle was the top speaker of the Canadian BP championship. Also in 2022, Diggory Waddle and Nicholas Abernethy won the Hart House IV and made the semi-finals of the Oxford IV, and this team broke at WUDC in 2023.

== Traditions ==
The Queen's Debating Union has developed a number of longstanding traditions that continue to the present day. The club's motto “Experientia Docet” is both a reference to the value of gaining knowledge and practice, as well as a reference to the ironic observation made by Aldous Huxley in his novel 'Antic Hay' that experience doesn't teach in the vast majority of circumstances, humans being resistant to breaking bad patterns.

The Union has many traditions common to debating societies, such as holiday celebrations and in-house tournaments, as well as traditions unique to the club, including a secret initiation ceremony and the maintenance of a large golden gown. The club is also the only institution in Canada to enforce something called the "Queen's Rule", an injunction that prevents any member or guest from insulting the Monarch of Canada. A tradition of performing a Gaelic song and dance native to Queen's University called the "Oil Thigh" has been adopted for external tournaments to express solidarity and historical continuity with the club's tradition of excellence. A related activity is the Queen's song, which references past exploits and future resolve, both in the context of academic debate standing as well as social vigour.

The end of every academic year is marked by ceremony known as the 'Closing of the House', which occurs in the historical Hand Purvis Room of Dunning Hall and involves a public debate of graduating members, internal award ceremonies, and a symbolic concluding ceremony.

The club's internal honors include The Lorna Breckon Novice Award, which recognizes a novice member of the club who has proven both their dedication and competitive potential in addition to demonstrating strength of character, the Thomas Holloway Award, given annually to the QDU member found to have made the most significant contribution to the club for that year, the Robert Sutherland Award, to recognize the member of the Union who has achieved the most success in competitive debate for that year and finally the Debating Blue award, given to a graduating member of the club who has demonstrated extraordinary commitment to the QDU. The Debating Blue Award is named for the official colour of the Union and as a show of the club's gratitude for their enduring dedication, the recipient of the award becomes an honorary lifelong member of the Union.

== Notable former members ==
- Ted Hsu, former Member of Parliament for Kingston and the Islands
- Robert Sutherland, the first known University Graduate of African Descent and the first man of African descent to practice law in Canada.
- Cora Taylor Casselman, Liberal member of Parliament for Edmonton East 1941–1945, she was the fourth female representative elected to the Canadian Parliament.
- Alfred Bader, prominent chemist, philanthropist, art collector, businessman and generous benefactor of the university.
- Johsa Manzanilla, the first Filipino, first female ethnic minority, and youngest rector of Queen's when she took that position who was named the most outstanding Filipino-Canadian of 2006.

== Related ==
- (United Kingdom) : Cambridge Union Society
- (United Kingdom) : Oxford Union Society
- (United Kingdom) : The Durham Union Society
- (United States) : Berkeley Forum
- (United States) : Yale Debate Association
- (Sweden) : Studentafton
- (France) : Olivaint Conférence
- : Olivaint Conference of Belgium
- (Germany) : Debattierclub Stuttgart
- (Germany) : Studentenforum im Tönissteiner Kreis
- (United States) : Calliopean Society

== See also ==
- List of college literary societies
