= Studentafton =

Swedish forum for speech and debate

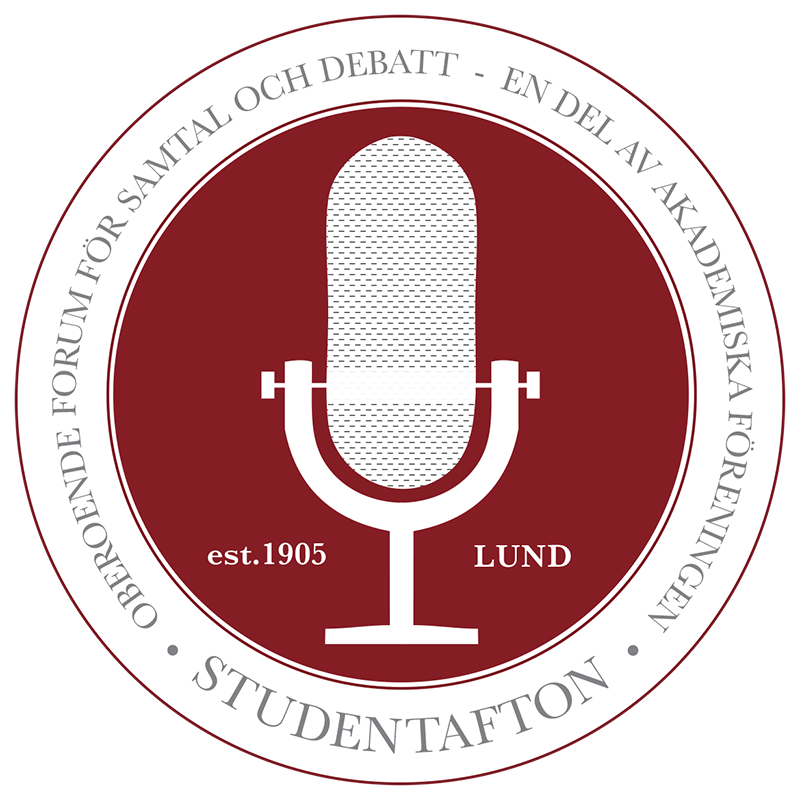
- Formation: 1905
- Type: Student debating union
- Headquarters: Lund, Sweden
- Location: Sandgatan 2, Lund
- Website: www.studentafton.se

Studentafton is Scandinavia's leading politically and religiously independent forum for speech and debate and is a part of the Academic Society at Lund University. The Academic Society is a non-profit organization of students and teachers at Lund University. The tradition of Studentafton was established in 1905.

For over a hundred years, Studentafton has invited to evenings featuring politicians, authors, musicians, Nobel laureate, scientists, journalists and opinion leaders to perform for Lund's students. The organization's main task is to honor freedom of speech.

Evenings have historically been a feature of contemporary life and an indicator of which way winds are blowing. Political changes and cultural phenomena have all been addressed by prominent guests from the podium at Studentafton. The association is therefore often referred to as "Sweden's freest lectern". Over 1,500 evenings have been organized throughout the years.

Studentafton is independent of Lund University.

== Past speakers ==
Throughout the years, a large number of prominent guests have spoken or performed at Studentafton in Lund. The guests have been prominent figures in their respective fields. They include politicians, royalties, musicians, opinion leaders and cultural personalities.

=== Politicians and royalty ===
All Swedish Prime Ministers since Per Albin Hansson has appeared on Studentafton. Other prominent guests include Emmanuel Macron, F.W. de Klerk, Bruno Kreisky, Queen Silvia of Sweden, Queen Margrethe II of Denmark, Pierre Mendès France, Dag Hammarskjöld, Ingrid Betancourt, Henry Kissinger and Willy Brandt.

=== Musicians ===
Historically, international celebrities have visited Studentafton in Lund. Visitors include Jimi Hendrix, Pink Floyd, Louis Armstrong, Ella Fitzgerald, Dizzy Gillespie, Frank Zappa, Ray Charles, Muddy Waters and Miriam Makeba.

From Sweden, visitors include Monica Zetterlund, Evert Taube, Alice Babs and Georg Riedel.

=== Opinion leaders ===
Controversial speakers and opinion leaders have been invited over the years including Jesse Jackson, Edward Snowden, Bobby Seale, Pussy Riot, Günter Wallraff and Leni Riefenstahl.

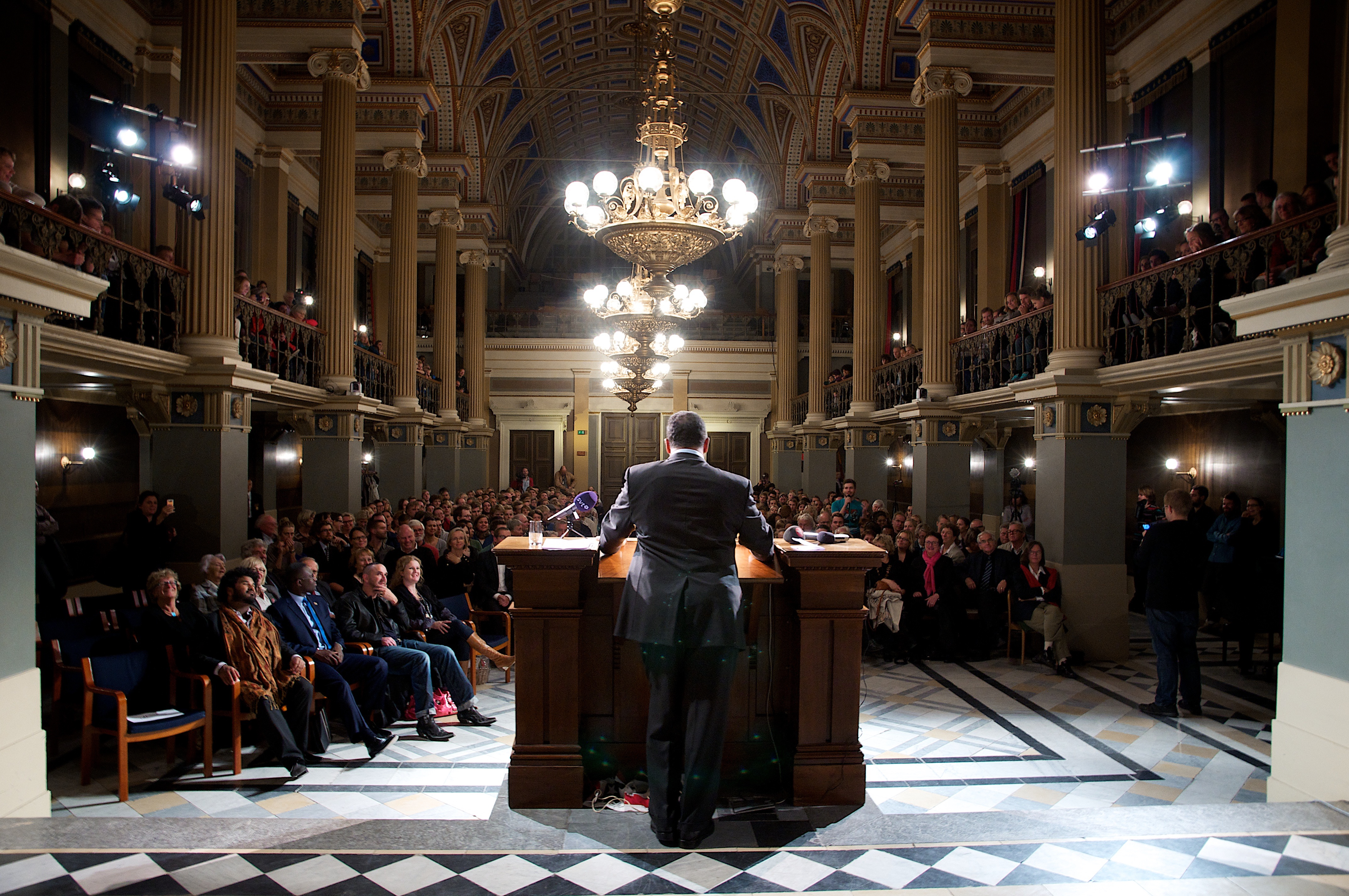
Reverend Jesse Jackson at Studentafton on the 12th of October, 2011

=== Cultural personalities ===
A number of cultural personalities have visited, including film directors Ingmar Bergman, Jaques Tati, Ruben Östlund and Roger Vadim, and the author John le Carré.

== Prime Minister's Evening ==
All Swedish Prime Ministers since Per Albin Hansson has appeared on Studentafton. Tage Erlander created the concept of "Statsministerafton" (Prime Minister's Evening) in 1956 and subsequently visited Studentafton 19 times.

Since then, all Swedish prime ministers have visited a Statsministerafton at least once during their term of office. Prime Ministers Per Albin Hansson, Tage Erlander, Olof Palme, Thorbjörn Fälldin, Ola Ullsten, Ingvar Carlsson, Carl Bildt, Göran Persson, Fredrik Reinfeldt, Stefan Löfven, Magdalena Andersson and the current Prime Minister, Ulf Kristersson, have all attended a "Statsministerafton".

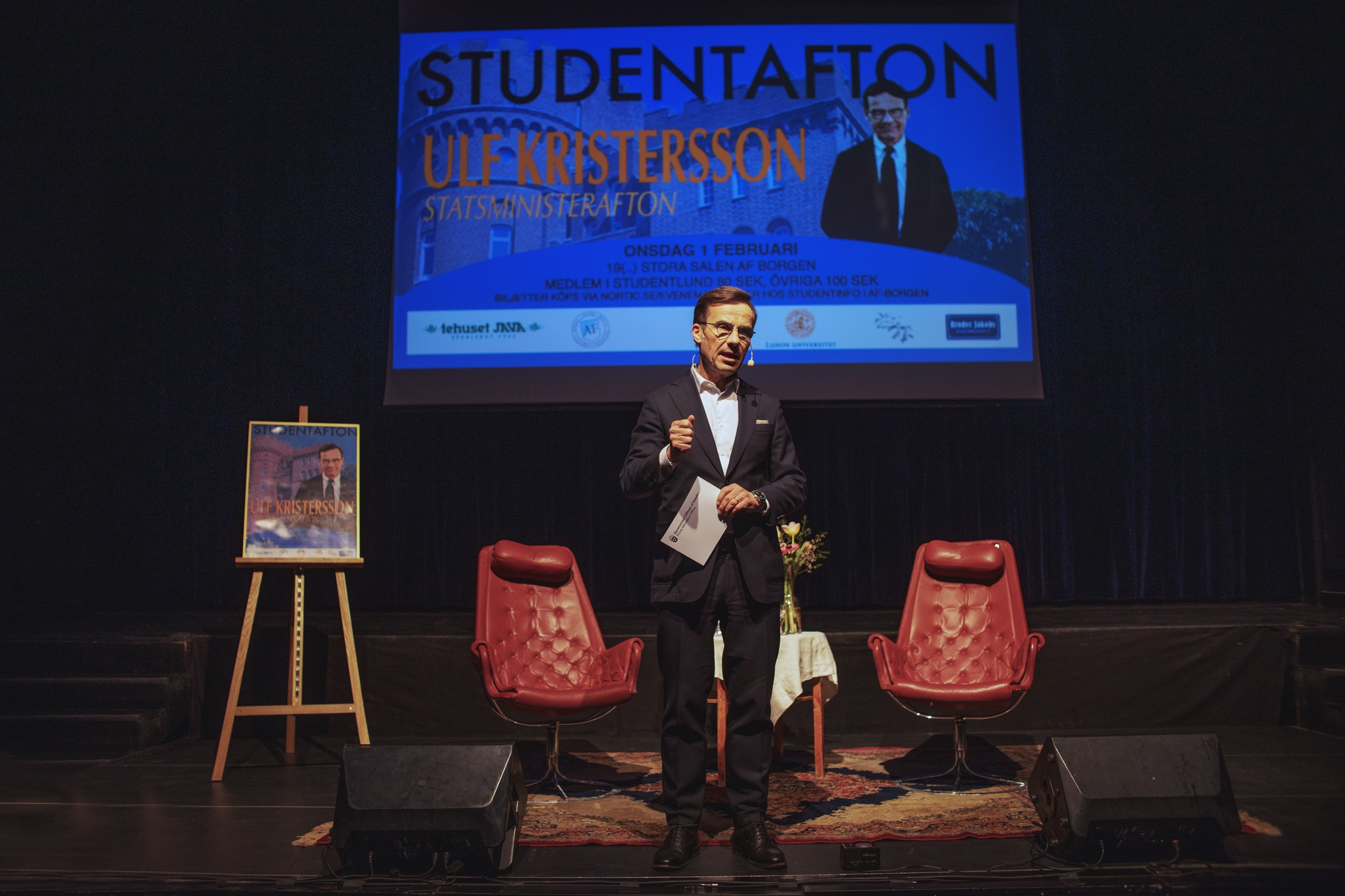
Prime Minister's Evening with Ulf Kristersson on 1 February 2023

The most recent Prime Minister's Evening took place on 1 February 2023, with Ulf Kristersson.

== See also ==
- University of California, Berkeley
- Oxford Union
- Cambridge Union Society
- Yale Political Union
- Olivaint Conference of Belgium
- Conférence Olivaint
- The Durham Union Society
