= Party of the Left =

Party of the Left may refer to:

- The Left (Germany)
- Party of the Left (France)
- Party of the Left, a party of the Yale Political Union
