= Debattierclub Stuttgart =

Debating society of University of Stuttgart

The Debattierclub Stuttgart (DCS), also known as the Stuttgart Debating Union, is the debating society of the University of Stuttgart. It holds debates in both German and English. It was founded in 2004 and is now one of the internationally most successful German debating societies. The DCS is Vice World Champion and provided the Second Best Speaker of the World in English as a foreign language (EFL) at the World Universities Debating Championship (WUDC) 2010. At WUDC 2011, the DCS provided the Fourth Best Speaker of the World in English as a second language (ESL) as well as the Best Speaker of the World in EFL.

== History ==
After several months of informal meetings, the DCS was founded in 2004 on the initiative of Thorsten Rogowski as a student group at the University of Stuttgart in the form of a voluntary association. It was integrated into the Studium generale of the university as well as into the umbrella organisation for German-language debating societies, the VDCH. The purposes of the association are the cultivation of a culture of democratic debate and the imparting of rhetorical competencies. This is achieved by regular trainings in rhetorical methods and skills, followed by debates. Taking part in and organising debating competitions also contributes to the attainment of these goals. Therefore, DCS members regularly attend national tournaments like the Deutsche Debattiermeisterschaft (DDM) and international tournaments like the WUDC and the European Universities Debating Championship (EUDC).

== Activities ==
In 2003, the DCS already hosted the Baden-Württembergische Meisterschaft im Hochschuldebattieren (BaWü), a regional competition. In 2008, it organised the Süddeutsche Meisterschaft (SDM), and in 2010 as well as in 2011, it hosted a ZEIT Debatte with over 100 participants each. Also in 2011, the DCS hosted its first international tournament, the Stuttgart IV 2011. All of the tournaments were held in British Parliamentary Style. In addition, the club regularly organises friendly tournaments and exhibition debates, for example in Stuttgart City Hall in May 2011.

Since 2009, the DCS offers a rhetoric and argumentation training within the key qualifications program of the University of Stuttgart during each semester. Seminars for, amongst others, other debating societies, companies, youth organisations of parties, scholarship holders of the Baden-Württemberg Stiftung and summer school students at the University of Oxford complement the offers of service.

== Achievements ==
=== International ===
- Manchester IV 2011: Winner (ESL) - Andreas Lazar and Michael Saliba
- WUDC 2011: Semifinalist (ESL) - Andreas Lazar and Michael Saliba
- WUDC 2011: Fourth Best Speaker of the World (ESL) - Michael Saliba
- WUDC 2011: Best Speaker of the World (EFL) - Andreas Lazar
- Freshers' Cup 2010 of the Oxford Union: Winner - Michael Saliba
- WUDC 2010: Vice World Champion (EFL) - Igor Gilitschenski and Andreas Lazar
- WUDC 2010: Second Best Speaker of the World (EFL) - Nils Haneklaus

=== National ===
- DDM 2013: Finalist - Michael Saliba
- ZEIT Debatte Marburg 2013: Best Speaker Award - Nils Haneklaus
- ZEIT Debatte Tübingen 2012: Winner - Igor Gilitschenski, Michael Saliba und Nils Haneklaus
- ZEIT Debatte Münster 2012: Winner - Igor Gilitschenski and Michael Saliba
- DDM 2011: Quarterfinalist - Igor Gilitschenski, Nils Haneklaus and Michael Saliba
- BaWü 2010: Vice Champion - Nils Haneklaus, Andreas Lazar and Kai Nosbüsch
- DDM 2010: Quarterfinalist - Igor Gilitschenski and Michael Saliba
- SDM 2010: Vice Champion - Igor Gilitschenski and Michael Saliba
- BaWü 2009: Vice Champion - Igor Gilitschenski, Kathrin Reinhold and Michael Saliba
- BaWü 2007: Vice Champion - Andreas Lazar, Kathrin Reinhold and Florian Wilken

== Related ==
- (United Kingdom) : Cambridge Union Society
- (United Kingdom) : Oxford Union Society
- (United Kingdom) : The Durham Union Society
- (United Kingdom) : London School of Economics, Grimshaw International Relations Club
- (United States) :Yale Debate Association
- (United States) :Berkeley Forum
- (France) :Olivaint Conférence
- (Germany) :Studentenforum im Tönissteiner Kreis
- :Olivaint Conference of Belgium

== Links ==
- Debattierclub Stuttgart
- Verband der Debattierclubs an Hochschulen
- Achte Minute: Online magazine of German-language debating
