= Olivaint Conference of Belgium =

Organization

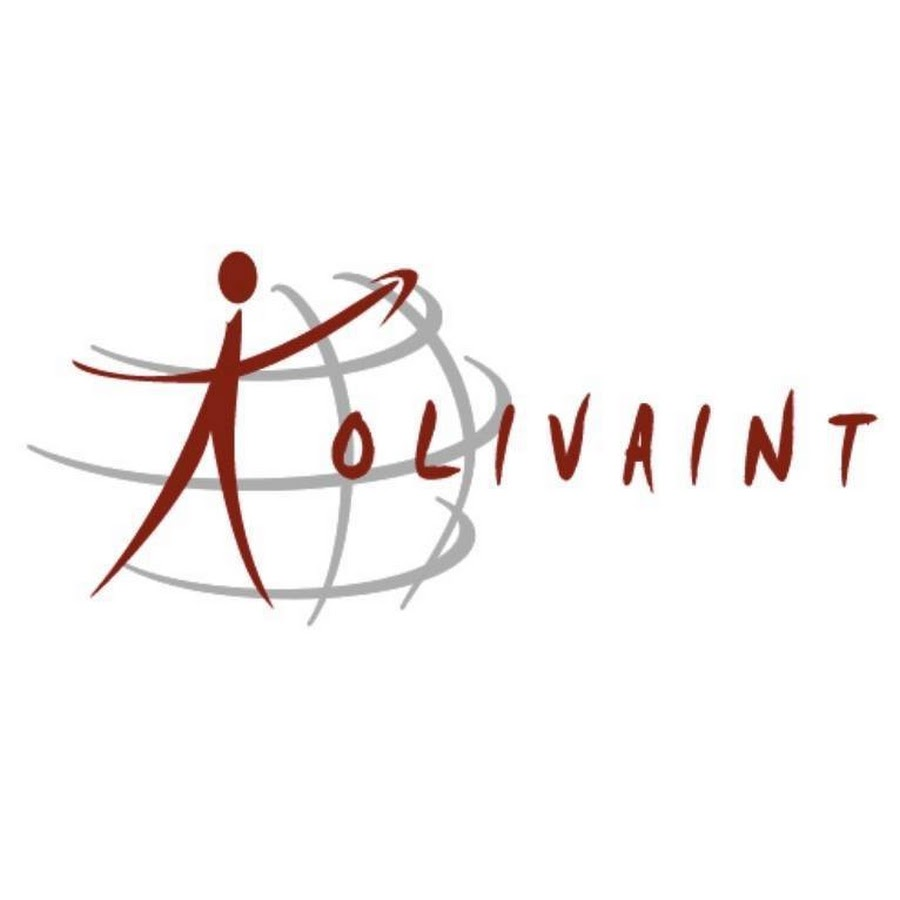
- Abbreviation: OCB
- Formation: 1954
- Type: Student debating union
- Purpose: Education
- Headquarters: University Foundation
- Location: Brussels
- Region served: Belgium
- Official language: Dutch & French (& English)
- President of the Student Board: Alexandra Garcia
- Affiliations: Politeia Community
- Website: olivaint.be

The Royal Olivaint Conference of Belgium NPO is a Belgian independent, multilingual leadership organisation and debating union and honor society for students founded in 1954. It is the only student organisation in Belgium operating in both official languages (Dutch & French). The slogan of the association is 'Teaching governance today, growing leaders for tomorrow'. Its aim is to educate its members for public life. Its focus is on training in public speaking, debating, writing and leading conferences with top politicians, academics and business executives. The Olivaint Conference of Belgium was founded on the model of the Conférence Olivaint in France. Candidate members must submit a written application and undergo an interview by the Conference's board of directors. The Conference limit its membership to 60 persons per academic term. Membership is limited to two years. Characteristic of the association is that the male members wear an 'Olivaint tie' with the society's logo during activities.

The association is a member of the Politeia Community, an international network of similar organizations like Olivaint Conférence and Studentenforum im Tönissteiner Kreis. The Olivaint Conference of Belgium is a sister organisation of the Oxford Union Society.

== Activities ==
Its main activity is organizing bimonthly thematic meetings. These meetings take place at the University Foundation in Brussels on Saturday afternoons. During these meetings, the students hold oral speaking exercises following the Chatham House Rule. Those public speaking exercises allow students to become acquainted with effective speech techniques. These exercises are judged by an experienced corrector, which enables the student to significantly improve his/her speech level. After those exercises the members have the opportunity to meet with prominent actors of the Belgian socio-economic, political, academic and cultural scene.

In addition to the thematic workshops, members have to contribute with written articles to the magazine “Contact”.

An eloquence contest, sponsored by the InBev-Baillet Latour Fund, among its members is organised once a year. The event is opened to former and non-members.

At the end of each academic year a study session abroad, under he patronage of the national and regional ministers of Foreign Affairs, is organised. After the trip, a report is published.

=== Weimar Youth Forum ===
The Olivaint Conference of Belgium is a participant of the Weimar Youth Forum. This is a yearly meeting of the Studentenforum im Tonissteiner Kreis (Germany), the Centrum Inicjatyw Miedzynarodowych (Poland), the Olivaint Conference of Belgium and La Conférence Olivaint (France). The organization of the Forum follows the example of the ‘Weimar Triangle’, regrouping France, Germany and Poland on international affairs matters, first hold in 1991 after the fall of the Berlin Wall. The Forum was first organized in 2004 in Warsaw. Since then, it has been held every year, promoting debate on economic, social and political issues in Europe. The Forum thus allows discussing these matters, confronting them with the European integration project. All of this is done in an independent spirit.

=== 50 years of existence symposium ===
In 2005 the conference celebrated its 50 birthday by organising a symposium at the Egmont Palace. The event attracted many alumni and prestigious guests, including his Royal Highness the Prince Philippe of Belgium, former prime minister and Olivaint alumni Jean-Luc Dehaene, minister Armand De Decker, viscount Étienne Davignon and many more.

=== 70 years Olivaint ===
On November 22, 2024, the Olivaint Society celebrated its 70th anniversary at the Queen Elisabeth Music Chapel with a speech by the director, guided tours, and a walking dinner for all members and alumni.

== Notable former members ==
The conference also organises few activities for the more than 1,100 alumni.

- Jacques van Ypersele de Strihou, Minister of State and former chief of staff king Baudouin of Belgium and king Albert II of Belgium
- François-Xavier de Donnea, a Belgian politician and a former mayor of the City of Brussels
- Alexia Bertrand, non-executive director at Ackermans & Van Haaren and politician for MR
- Jean-Luc Dehaene, former prime minister of Belgium and Member of the European Parliament
- Francis Delpérée, senator and professor of the Université catholique de Louvain
- Bernard Lietaer, the author of The Future of Money: Beyond Greed and Scarcity
- Luc Willame, former CEO AGC Glass Europe

== Related ==
- (United Kingdom) : Cambridge Union Society
- (United Kingdom) : Oxford Union Society
- (Sweden) : Studentafton
- (United Kingdom) : Grimshaw Club (LSE)
- (United Kingdom) : Durham Union Society
- (United States) : Berkeley Forum
- (United States) : Yale Debate Association
- (France) : Olivaint Conférence
- (Germany) : Debattierclub Stuttgart
- (Germany) : Studentenforum im Tönissteiner Kreis
- (Hungary) : Common Sense Society Budapest
- (Canada) : Queen's Debating Union
- (United States) : Calliopean Society
- Association of College Honor Societies
