= Conférence Olivaint =

French youth association

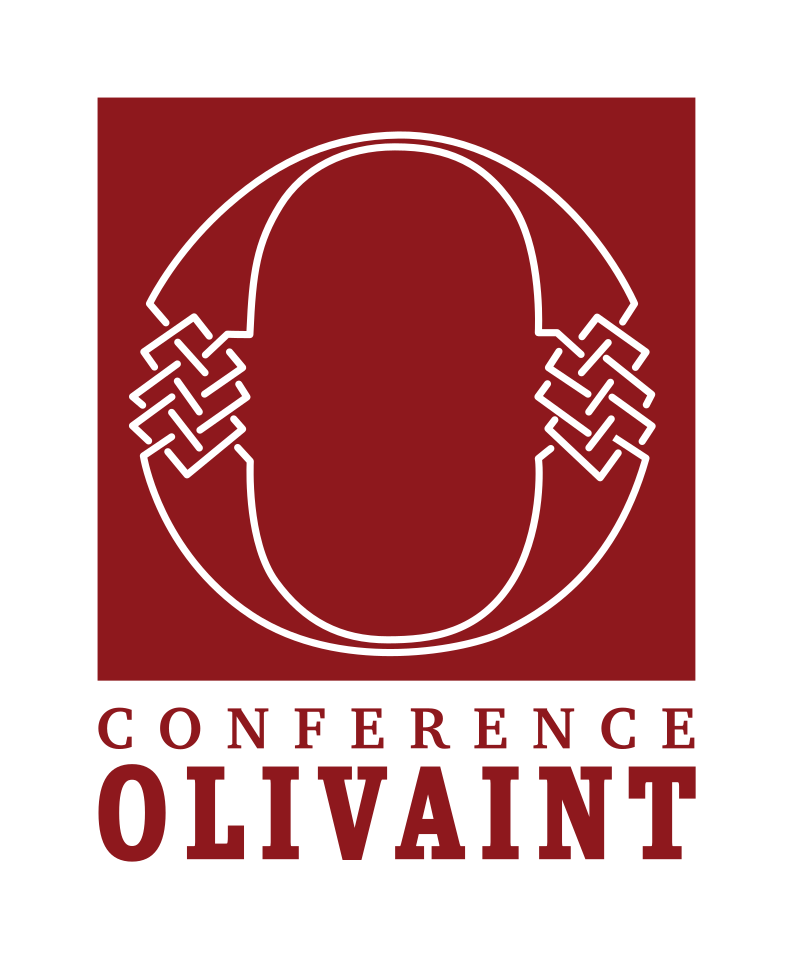
- Named after: Father Pierre Olivaint
- Formation: 1874
- Region served: France
- Members: Limited to 150
- Affiliations: Olivaint Conference of Belgium
- Website: http://www.conferenceolivaint.fr

The Conférence Olivaint is a French youth association, recognised as being of general interest.

Founded in fall 1874, it is the oldest student association in France. Its mission is to provide young people with training in public life, notably by holding weekly conferences with political figures and, since 2003, with personalities from civil, economic and cultural spheres.

The Conférence Olivaint model has been adopted in Belgium, where there is a Belgian Conférence Olivaint since 1954.

== History ==
The Conférence Olivaint was established in the fall of 1874 by Jesuits. It was named after Father Olivaint, superior of the Jesuits on Rue de Sèvres, who was executed on May 26, 1871, along with other hostages, by the Communards. These executions came as a response to the Versailles Repression during the "Bloody Week" of the Paris Commune.

Father Olivaint wished to train young people for public and political life: "If you are driven towards a political career, it is important that you be highly ranked. In a time of revolution, it is necessary, through knowledge, character, and independence, to rise above all parties, to see only the interests of the country and to devote oneself to its salvation", he said.

The goal of the Conférence Olivaint at the time was to recruit young people form the Rue de Sèvres Congregation and prepare them to become defenders of the Church and the country.

The Wednesday session has been a tradition at the Conférence Olivaint since its creation. During these sessions, the guest would deliver a speech of general scope, often with strong political or moral connotations.

The Conférence Olivaint benefited from ultramontanism. Indeed, Pope Pius IX, and later Pope Leo XIII, bestowed their apostolic blessing on the Conférence Olivaint, insisting on the specific role that this organisation fulfilled in their eyes. They described it as "of public interest to society".

In the wake of the First World War and until the Second, the Conférence Olivaint wished to focus its debates on the international scene. The Conférence Olivaint invited personalities from all political backgrounds.

In 1946, the Conférence Olivaint invited Italian students to come and exchange with the Olivaints on the theme "Democracy and Fascism". The following year, the first of a series of Franco-German sessions was held on the topic of "Responsibility and Nazism".

After the war, the Conférence Olivaint was rather Christian-Democratic and, above all, pro-European. In 1968, secularism was widely accepted in the Conférence, under the presidency of Laurent Fabius (Youth Branch) and Hervé de Charette (Alumni Branch). In the 1980s, many of François Mitterrand's collaborators were recruited by Alumni, such as Jacques Attali or Hubert Védrine. In 2013, under the impetus of the Youth Branch, secularism was included as a founding principle in the statutes and rules of the association.

Originally intended for a male audience, the Olivaint Conference opened its doors to women in the 1950s and, in 1970, elected its first woman president, Angéline Arrighi. Today, the association is nearing parity. For the 2021–2022 mandate, the association recruited a majority of female members (51%). In 2022, 40% of the association's members were women.

On May 26, 2021, the association commemorated the 150th anniversary of the Commune and the death of Father Olivaint at an event that brought together the two branches of the Conference.

== Functioning ==
Recruitment of new members of the Conférence Olivaint is carried out through a process based on the preliminary study of an application (including a cover letter and a resume) and, subsequently, an individual interview with the Conférence Olivaint Recruitment Officers.

After three years, members of the Youth Branch recognized for their involvement in the life of the Association can access the Alumni Branch.

The Youth Branch comprises a large majority of students and a minority of young professionals.

The age limit for applying to the Conférence Olivaint is set at thirty years.

Among these students, in 2022, there were about a quarter from Sciences Po Paris, a quarter from Assas, and a quarter from Sorbonne. The last quarter included students from the ICP, business schools (HEC, ESSEC, ESCP...), engineering schools (ENSAE, CentraleSupélec, Polytechnique...), normaliens (ENS, ENS Cachan), from communication schools (CELSA, ISCOM), Sciences Po Lille, Nanterre, l'École du Louvre and Dauphine.

Each year, as part of the elections, aspiring members to the board give their lists a name, which must be unique. The elected list then becomes the active board, called the "Bureau". Since June 2022, the Bureau "Simone Weil" leads the Conférence Olivaint.

== Activities ==
The Conference's main activity is organizing weekly conferences with leading figures from the political sphere and civil society. Although these conferences are open to the public, the tradition is to maintain confidentiality on what is said during these conferences. They take place in Paris, and are often held at Sciences Po, the Institut Catholique de Paris, the Cercle France-Amériques or the Sorbonne. In parallel, master class, outings and internal events complete the training provided.

Another tradition of the Conférence Olivaint is public speaking training. Each weekly lecture is preceded by a debate and a portrait of the guest. Since 1947, lawyers have given eloquence master classes. Jacques Pradon, Mario Stasi and Olivier Schnerb have served in succession as public speaking advisors to the Conférence Olivaint. Since 2017, François Martineau and Antoine Vey have filled this office.

Since 2008, the Conférence Olivaint organizes, in collaboration with the Conférence des avocats du Barreau de Paris, the "Joute des Conférences", an annual public speaking competition. This competition was held at Sciences Po Paris in 2012, in the auction room of the Palais de Justice in 2013, at the Conseil d’Etat in 2014, at the Library of the Paris Bar Association at the Palais de Justice in 2015, under the chairmanship of Christian Charrière-Bournazel, at the Assemblée Nationale in 2016 under the chairmanship of Minister Marylise Lebranchu, and at the Bar house in 2017 under the chairmanship of Minister Hervé de Charette

The exception is 2018, as the "Joute des Conférences" did not take place.

The 2019 edition took place at the Library of the Paris Bar Association under the chairmanship of Antoine Vey.

Due to the COVID-19 pandemic, the Joute was initially suspended in 2020, before being postponed to fall 2021. This edition took place in the 16th arrondissement town hall, while the Library of the Paris Bar Association hosted the 2021 edition in May 2022. The next edition will take place in fall 2022.

In 2017, the Olivaint Conference created the Olivier Schnerb Prize for Eloquence in tribute to its late oratorical advisor.

The Olivaint Conference also organises each year

- A symposium open to the public :

- in 2006 at the Institut du Monde Arabe on the theme of integration
- in 2007 at the National Assembly on the theme of higher education.
- in 2008 at Sciences Po Paris on the theme of immigration.
- in 2009 at the National Assembly on the subject of "Decision and power in French society".
- in 2010 at the National Assembly on the subject of "France in the face of political reforms".
- in 2011 at the Senate on the subject "Resurrecting Europe."
- in 2012 at the Town Hall of the 5th arrondissement of Paris on the subject "French Youth in 2012."
- in 2013 at Sciences Po Paris on the theme: "Stimulating the creativity of youth."
- in 2014 at the National Assembly on the topic: "Rethinking global governance, why? With whom? How?". This colloquium was held in collaboration with the Assembly of Young Francophones for International Organizations (AJFOI).
- in 2015 at the National Assembly on the subject: "Reforming France."
- in 2016 at ENS on the subject: "Portrait of France at war."
- in 2017 at the Senate on the subject: "Women and power."
- in 2018 at the National Assembly on the subject: "French defense: a uniquely military affair?".
- in 2019 at the Paris 1 Panthéon-Sorbonne University on the subject: " Digital (R)Evolution: Between threat and progress."
- in 2021 at Sciences Po Paris on the subject: "Taking hold of secularism."
- in 2022 at the Climate Academy on the subject: "The State in the face of climate disruption."

- A study trip, where members of the Conference meet political figures from the country visited (Argentine and Uruguay in 2005, Ukraine in 2006, Turkey in 2007, the United States in 2010, Kosovo in 2011, China in 2012, Tunisia in 2013, Iran in 2014, Greece in 2016, Lebanon, the Vatican, Italy in 2017, Romania in 2019, Senegal in 2022),.

In 2021, due to the pandemic, the study trip took place on the island of Port-Cros, on which the Olivaint Conference organized international seminars from the end of the Second World War until the end of the 1970s.

- A short story contest. The last subjects were: "Courage let’s flee!" (2011), "Sans culottes" (2012), "Veiled lisses" (2013), "Living standing" (2014), "Utopia" (2017), "Desire" in (2022)

- The Weimar Forum, which brings together young students from Germany, Poland and France at an international symposium. In 2017, the forum was held at the National Assembly on the topic of digitalisation and Europe, under the patronage of Prime Minister Jean-Marc Ayrault and the Commission Supérieure du Numérique et des Postes.

The Olivaint Conference maintains partnerships with various universities, academic institutions, and international organizations. These networks are based on shared principles of independence and public engagement.

The Olivaint Conference counts among its historical partners Sciences Po Paris, the Panthéon-Sorbonne University, the Institut Catholique de Paris, INALCO, the Studierendenforum im Tönissteiner Kreis, the Circle France-Amériques and the Institut de France. Some partnerships also serve more short-term purposes, such as the one forged in 2014 with the Société universitaire canadienne de débat inter-collégial to participate in various tournaments. This project resulted in an Olivaint delegation being sent to Montreal for the Canadian National Debate Championship and in a Canadian delegation being hosted in Paris.

== Alumni ==
The Alumni Branch of the Conférence Olivaint has a board of Directors, chaired by Professor Antoine Souchaud since 2019, which oversees the long-term success of the Conférence Olivaint. They form an informal network and are less regular in their activities than the Youth Branch.

Among the Alumni of the Conférence Olivaint are Laurent Fabius, Karine Berger, Jean-Louis Bourlanges, Jean-Pierre Chevènement, Dominique Perben, Jean-François Deniau, Jacques Attali, Hubert Védrine, Hervé de Charette, Michel Barnier, Frédéric Mitterrand, Arnaud Montebourg, Éric Woerth, Mounir Mahjoubi, Henri de Gaulle, Michel Charasse, François d'Aubert, Alain Poher, Jean-Noël Jeanneney, Dominique Perben, Michel Vauzelle, René Pleven, Vincent Chauvet, Robert Schuman, Georges Bidault, Marguerite Bérard (fr), Jacques Attali, Jean-Claude Casanova, Raphaël Enthoven, Isabelle Huppert, Érik Orsenna, Jean-François Deniau, Michel Bon, Philippe-Joseph Salazar, Christine Ockrent, Paul Michaux, François Zimeray, Anne Carvello

== See also ==
- Olivaint Conference of Belgium
- Tönissteiner Kreis e.V.
- Yale Political Union
- Berkeley Forum
- Oxford Union Society
- Cambridge Union Society
- Grimshaw Club (LSE)
