= Berkeley Forum =

The Berkeley Forum
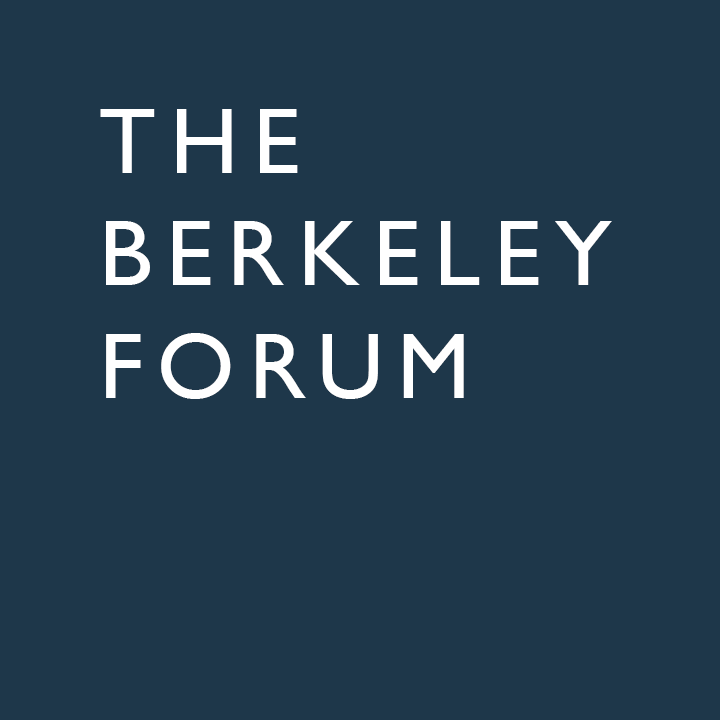
- The logo of the Berkeley Forum
- Formation: 2012
- Type: Student organization
- Location: Berkeley, California
- Sponsorships: Haas School of Business, ASUC
- Website: forum.berkeley.edu

The Berkeley Forum, referred to simply as the Forum, is a prominent, non-partisan student organization at the University of California, Berkeley. Founded in 2012, the Forum hosts debates, panels, and talks with distinguished speakers on various topics; it is modeled after similar organizations at other prestigious universities, like the Oxford Union, Cambridge Union, and Yale Political Union.

The Forum's events typically feature speeches by the speakers, followed by question and answer sessions with the audience.

== Notable past events ==
The Berkeley Forum's first event was a panel debate on the federal fiscal crisis, held in March 2013. The panel featured former Secretary of Labor Robert Reich, policy director of the 2012 Romney presidential campaign Lanhee Chen, and the Dean of the Goldman School of Public Policy Henry E. Brady.

In November 2013, the Forum hosted Creative Commons co-founder and American academic and political activist, Lawrence Lessig. Lessig discussed the role of money in politics, in a speech entitled "Corrupting the Vote." The Forum's largest and most noteworthy event to date was a speech given by Kentucky Senator Rand Paul on March 19, 2014. Senator Paul talked about the issue of government surveillance programs, like that of the NSA. The event was held at Chevron Auditorium at Berkeley's International House with approximately 400 people in attendance. The next day, the event was featured on the front page of The New York Times. Other notable attendees include former Secretary of Labor Robert Reich and Lieutenant Governor of California Gavin Newsom. In March 2014, the Berkeley Forum also hosted former US Secretary of Energy and Nobel Laureate Steven Chu. Chu spoke about sustainable energy options.

On November 14, 2014, the Berkeley Forum hosted Oakland mayor Jean Quan. Quan spoke about local government and inequality in American cities. Then, on December 10, the Forum hosted American entrepreneur and venture capitalist, Peter Thiel. The event was interrupted by protesters.

During the spring of 2015 the Forum hosted a number of events with such speakers as Johns Hopkins School of Advanced International Studies Dean Vali Nasr, graphic designer John Maeda, Berkeley mayor Tom Bates, Slovak Minister of Foreign Affairs Miroslav Lajčák, American legal scholar Akhil Amar, Khan Academy founder Salman Khan, Russian State Duma member Ilya Ponomarev, American Civil Liberties Union president Susan Herman, University of California, Berkeley chancellor Nicholas Dirks, UC Berkeley Executive Vice Chancellor and Provost Claude Steele, and congressmen John Sarbanes, Jerry McNerney, Jared Huffman, and Mark DeSaulnier. The panel with Dirks and Steele was interrupted by protesters. During the session the organization also hosted a screening of Killswitch.

Later in 2015, the Berkeley Forum also hosted events with US Secretary of Homeland Security Jeh Johnson, Kabam co-founder and CEO Kevin Chou, Nonhuman Rights Project founder Steven M. Wise, virtual reality journalist Nonny de la Peña, LGBT rights activist Cecilia Chung, immigration policy analyst Alex Nowrasteh, political activist and writer Ron Unz, American journalist and editor-in-chief of the tech hub for Medium Steven Levy, former United States Trade Representative Ron Kirk, Pixar Research Group Lead Tony DeRose, and American political satirist P. J. O'Rourke.

In 2016, the Forum hosted the 16th United States Secretary of Housing and Urban Development, Julian Castro; the 17th Director of Central Intelligence, John M. Deutch; the Director of the Center for Bits and Atoms at the Massachusetts Institute of Technology, Neil Gershenfeld; the 28th Chief Justice of California, Tani Cantil-Sakauye; CEO of Liberty in North Korea, Hannah Song; prominent Norwegian politician Åslaug Haga; United States Ambassador to Vietnam Ted Osius; United States senator from Maine, Angus King; comedian Sammy Obeid; Director of Columbia University's Data Science Institute, Jeannette Wing; and Turkish journalist Mustafa Akyol.

== Advisory committee ==
While the Berkeley Forum is a student-run organization, it is supported by a faculty advisory committee, which consists of the following professors:

- Alexander Coward
- Brian Delay
- Christopher Edley
- John Ellwood
- Alexei Filippenko
- Paul Pierson
- Robert Reich

== See also ==
- University of California, Berkeley
- Oxford Union
- Cambridge Union Society
- Yale Political Union
- Olivaint Conference of Belgium
- Conférence Olivaint
- The Durham Union Society
