= Yale Political Union =

Student debate society at Yale University

- Formation: 1934; 92 years ago
- Type: Student organization
- Headquarters: Connecticut Hall, Yale University, New Haven, U.S.
- Members: Around 300 members
- President: Savan Parikh (Progs)
- Speaker: Kai-Shan Kwek-Rupp (Progs)
- Historian: Emmet MacKay (Tory)
- Website: yaleunion.com

The Yale Political Union (YPU) is a debate society at Yale University, founded in 1934 by Alfred Whitney Griswold. It was modeled on the Cambridge Union and Oxford Union and the party system of the defunct Yale Unions of the late nineteenth and early twentieth centuries, which were in turn inspired by the great literary debating societies of Linonia and Brothers in Unity. Members of the YPU have reciprocal rights at sister societies in England.

The union is an umbrella organization that currently contains seven parties: the Party of the Left (PoL), the Progressive Party (Progs), the Independent Party (IP), the Federalist Party (Feds), the Conservative Party (CP), the Tory Party (Tories), and the Party of the Right (PoR).

== History ==
This Union can be of undoubted value to nation and to the University, provided it maintains independence and voices the true thoughts of those participating… honest debates will help in the search for truthful answers. — Franklin D. Roosevelt, 1935

Founded in 1934, the Yale Political Union originally had three parties: the Liberal Party, the Radical Party, and the Conservative Party. It has seen the rise and fall of others since. The Radical Party reorganized into the Labor Party in 1937, but it has since become entirely defunct. In 1953, the Party of the Right was founded, contributing to a shift in the union's political landscape, and in 1969, the Tory Party emerged out of the Party of the Right, focusing on traditionalist conservatism. In 2010, the Federalist Party emerged out of the Tory party, claiming that the Tory Party had fallen out of traditionalist conservatism. The Liberal Party changed its name to the Socialist Party in 2019, subsequently left the union in 2020 and has since become defunct. The Progressive Party was founded in 1962, dissolved in the 2000s, and was reconstructed in 2020. The Conservative Party renamed itself the Independent Party in 1977. The modern Conservative Party, established in 1996, considers itself a reconstitution of the original Conservative Party. There remains debate over which party—the Independent Party or the modern Conservative Party—holds the true legacy of the original Conservative Party, with both claiming alumni from the pre-1977 era. The YPU regained strength throughout the 1970s, during which period the Liberal Party was by far the largest, but then suffered a severe blow shortly after A. Bartlett Giamatti became the Yale President.

After several years of rebuilding, the union recovered its numerical strength. This recovery moved into rapid gear during spring term of 1984 (under the presidency of Fareed Zakaria) when membership tripled to 900 during a term highlighted by a nationally televised debate. By the end of 1987, under the presidency of William Leake, active membership rolls comprised over 1,200 members, nearly 1/4 of the entire student body at Yale, and the YPU successfully launched a Model Congress; a magazine; an annual three-day visit to Washington D.C. for meetings with Cabinet members, Supreme Court justices, IMF and World Bank heads, foreign ambassadors and the director of the National Gallery of Art; and an on-topic debate team, which sent two union members overseas to the world debate championships. Then, the one-vote failure of an attempt to acquire the financially significantly stronger Yale International Relations (Model UN) program at Yale in spring 1987 (which would have made for a political powerhouse on campus), and the earlier 1980s loss of the YPU's dedicated facilities slowed momentum, and membership declined after a poor recruit in the fall of 1988.

In the early 1990s, membership reached another high point, but it then fell again, as a series of new political organizations on campus diverted politically active Yalies. Though smaller, the parties were relatively stronger and tighter institutions during this period. Most have remained intimate organizations, though with somewhat larger membership, to the current day.

One of the few enduring YPU spinoff publications, Rumpus magazine, was founded by members of the Progressive and Tory Parties in 1992. For the first 3–4 years of its publication, Rumpus remained closely linked to the YPU. One of the more sordid scandals of the period, involving a member who misappropriated the YPU's long-distance phone access number for calls to a racy 1-900 number from his senior single, was broken by Rumpus in the fall of 1994.

As more and more Yale undergraduate organizations were founded, the YPU lost its offices under Bingham Hall. It managed to retain its small office on Crown Street, although the union has recently begun a capital campaign to raise funds for a new building. The union's home is now in Connecticut Hall, the university's oldest building. During its various moves, irreplaceable historical archives were lost, although the YPU's collection of paraphernalia signed by noteworthy public figures is sizable. The YPU hit a low point in membership in the late 1990s. The YPU president, an Independent Party member, was impeached in the fall of 1997, leading to the near collapse of the Independent Party. The effects of this crisis took some time to reverse, though by 2001 the Independent Party was largely restored and began a period of significant growth. Now, the Independent Party is consistently the largest party in the Political Union. Although membership remains roughly 30% of its last peak in the late 1980s, the Political Union remains one of the largest undergraduate organizations at Yale, with approximately 325 members.

Although the union has fluctuated in its influence over the years, membership has generally been in decline since the 1980s. This is the result of the increase in outside political and activist groups that compete with the union for members. In addition, the intellectual rigor of the debates is generally considered to have decreased. Concerns have been raised about the union's relevance and effectiveness, pointing to declining guest quality and diminishing student engagement. However, defenders argue that the union's core mission of fostering open political dialogue remains vital in an ever-evolving campus landscape.

== Notable alumni ==
=== Labor Party ===
- Samuel P. Huntington (Party Leader, fall 1945), political theorist known for The Clash of Civilizations theory

=== Liberal Party ===
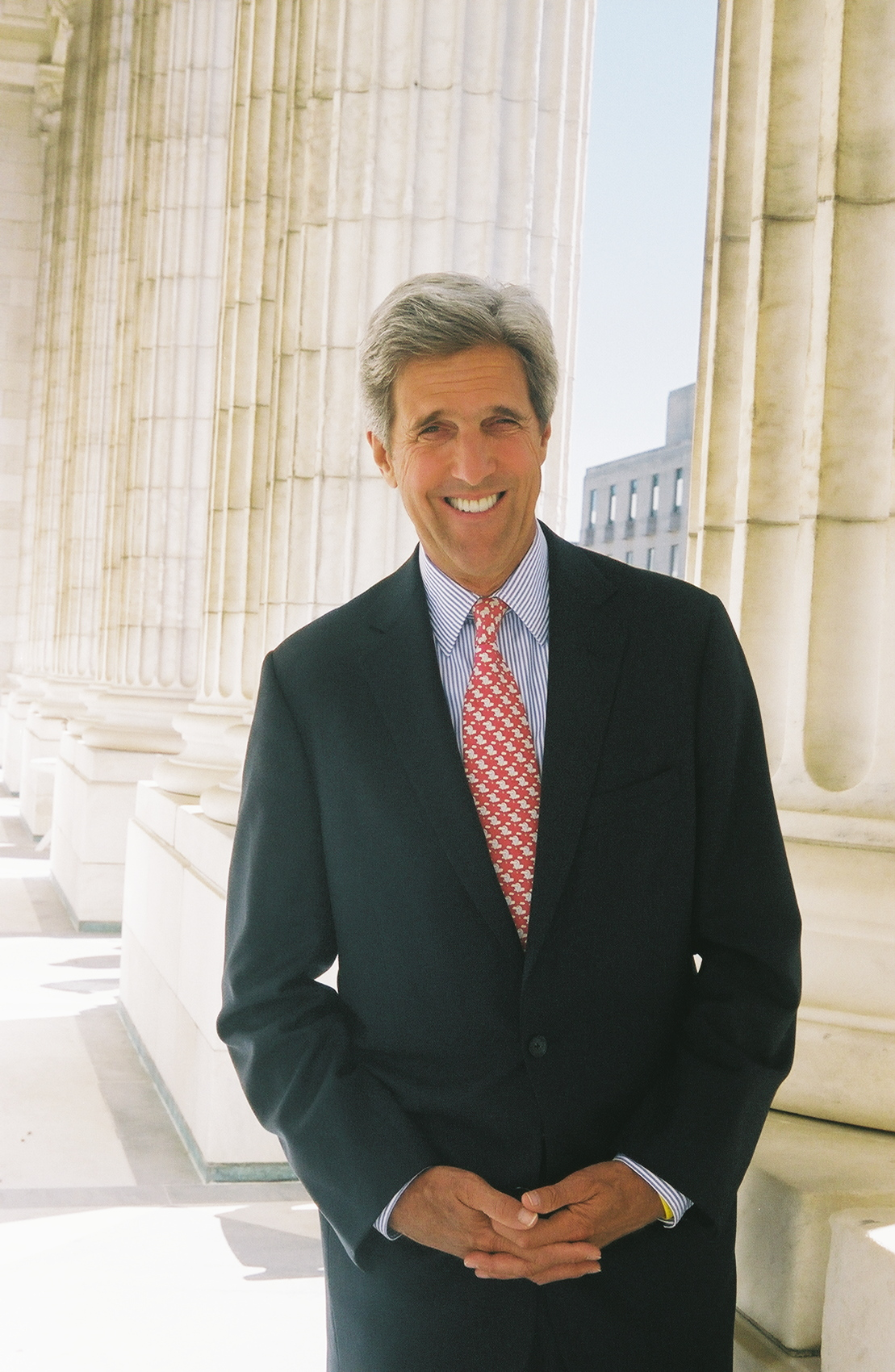
Former YPU president John Kerry

- Akhil Amar (party chairman, spring 1978), Sterling Professor of Law and Political Science at Yale University
- Peter Beinart (party chair, fall 1990) editor of The New Republic
- McGeorge Bundy (party chair, spring 1939), United States National Security Advisor
- William Bundy (YPU president, spring and fall 1938), advisor to Presidents John F. Kennedy and Lyndon B. Johnson
- David P. Calleo (party chair, fall 1953; YPU president, spring 1954), intellectual and political economist
- John F. Kerry (party chairman, spring 1964; YPU president, fall 1964 and spring 1965), US senator, United States Secretary of State and Democratic nominee for president in 2004
- Marvin Krislov (party chair, fall 1979), president of Oberlin College
- Robert C. Lieberman (party chair, spring 1984; YPU speaker, fall 1984), former provost of Johns Hopkins University
- John J. O'Leary (party chair, spring 1967; YPU president, fall 1967 and spring 1968), United States ambassador to Chile
- Richard Posner (party chair, spring 1957), judge for the United States Court of Appeals for the Seventh Circuit
- Kevin Ryan (party chair, fall 1982), founder and CEO of Gilt Groupe
- Katherine Tai, United States Trade Representative
- H. Bradford Westerfield (YPU president, fall 1945), Yale Professor of International Studies and Political Science
- Evan Wolfson (speaker, 1976), president of Freedom to Marry
- Neal Wolin (YPU president, fall 1981), Deputy Secretary of the U.S. Department of the Treasury

=== Progressive Party ===
- David M. McIntosh (YPU president, fall 1979), U.S. representative from Indiana and president of the Club for Growth
- Dana Milbank (party chair), columnist for The Washington Post

=== Conservative Party ===
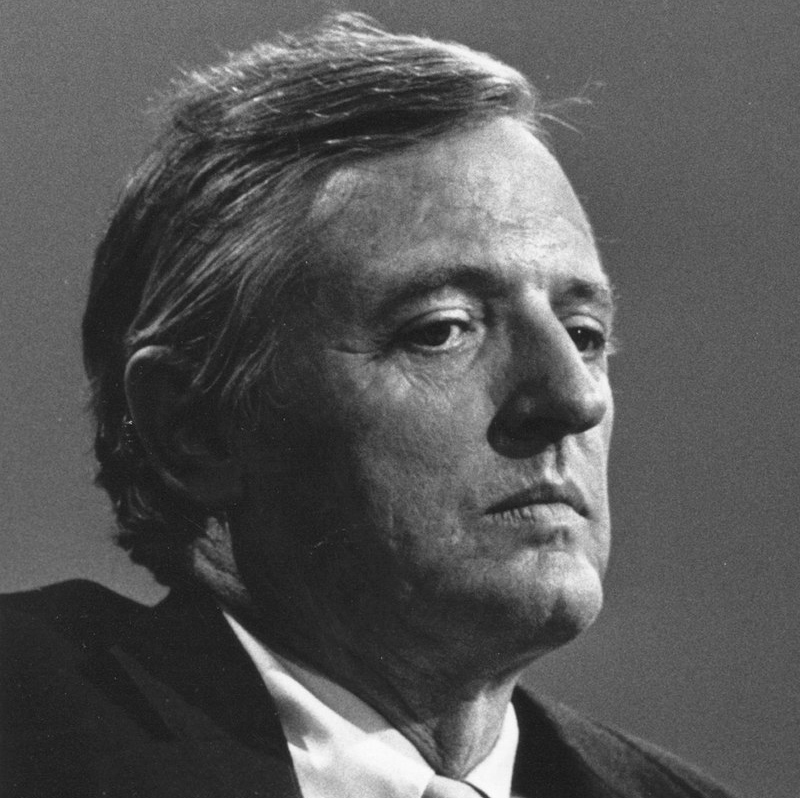
Conservative writer William F. Buckley, Jr.

- Robert A. Taft Sr. (party chair, fall 1909), Senator from Ohio
- Henry R. Luce, (party chair, fall 1919) founder of Time (magazine)
- Alfred Whitney Griswold, founder of Yale Political Union (est. 1934) and President of Yale, 1951-63
- Lyman Spitzer, theoretical physicist
- Whitelaw Reid II (party chair, fall 1935), chairman and president of the New York Herald Tribune
- Potter Stewart, associate justice of the United States Supreme Court
- William Howard Taft III, U.S. ambassador to Ireland
- William Scranton, Governor of Pennsylvania and U.S. ambassador to the United Nations.
- Robert Taft Jr., United States senator from Ohio
- James L. Buckley, U.S. senator from New York and federal judge on the United States Court of Appeals
- L. Brent Bozell Jr. (YPU president, spring 1949), conservative activist and Catholic writer
- John Glenn Beall Jr. (vice president, fall 1949), United States senator from Maryland
- Raymond Price (party chair, fall 1949 and spring 1950), speechwriter for President Richard Nixon
- William F. Buckley, founder of National Review and host of Firing Line
- Edwin Meese (party chair, spring 1951; YPU president, fall 1951), United States Attorney General
- David Boren, (YPU speaker), Governor of Oklahoma and U.S. senator from Oklahoma
- Bob Taft, Governor of Ohio
- John Watson Lungstrum (party chair, fall 1964), judge for the United States District Court for the District of Kansas
- James Harvie Wilkinson III (party chair, spring 1965), judge of the United States Court of Appeals for the Fourth Circuit
- George Pataki (party chair, fall 1965), Governor of New York
- Victor Ashe, American Ambassador and Diplomat
- John Bolton (floor leader of the Right, 1968), former United States ambassador to the United Nations
- Fred Krupp (party chair, spring 1973), president of the Environmental Defense Fund
- Patrick J. Bumatay, federal judge on the United States Court of Appeals for the Ninth Circuit
- Meghan Clyne (party chair, spring 2001), White House speechwriter for the George W. Bush administration and Publisher of City Journal
- Avik Roy (party chair, fall 1996), editor of Forbes magazine and Co-founder and Chairman of the Foundation for Research on Equal Opportunity (FREOPP)
- Aaron Sibarium, journalist for the Washington Free Beacon

=== Independent Party ===
- Steven Calabresi (YPU president, fall 1978), co-founder of the Federalist Society and professor of law at Northwestern University
- John Wertheim (party chair, fall 1987; YPU president, spring 1988), former chairman of the Democratic Party of New Mexico
- Jonathan Zittrain, (party chair, spring 1989), professor at Harvard Law School and the Harvard Kennedy School
- Austan Goolsbee, chairman of the Council of Economic Advisers
- John Avlon (party chair, fall 1994), editor-in-chief of The Daily Beast
- R. David Edelman, advisor to President Barack Obama

=== Tory Party ===
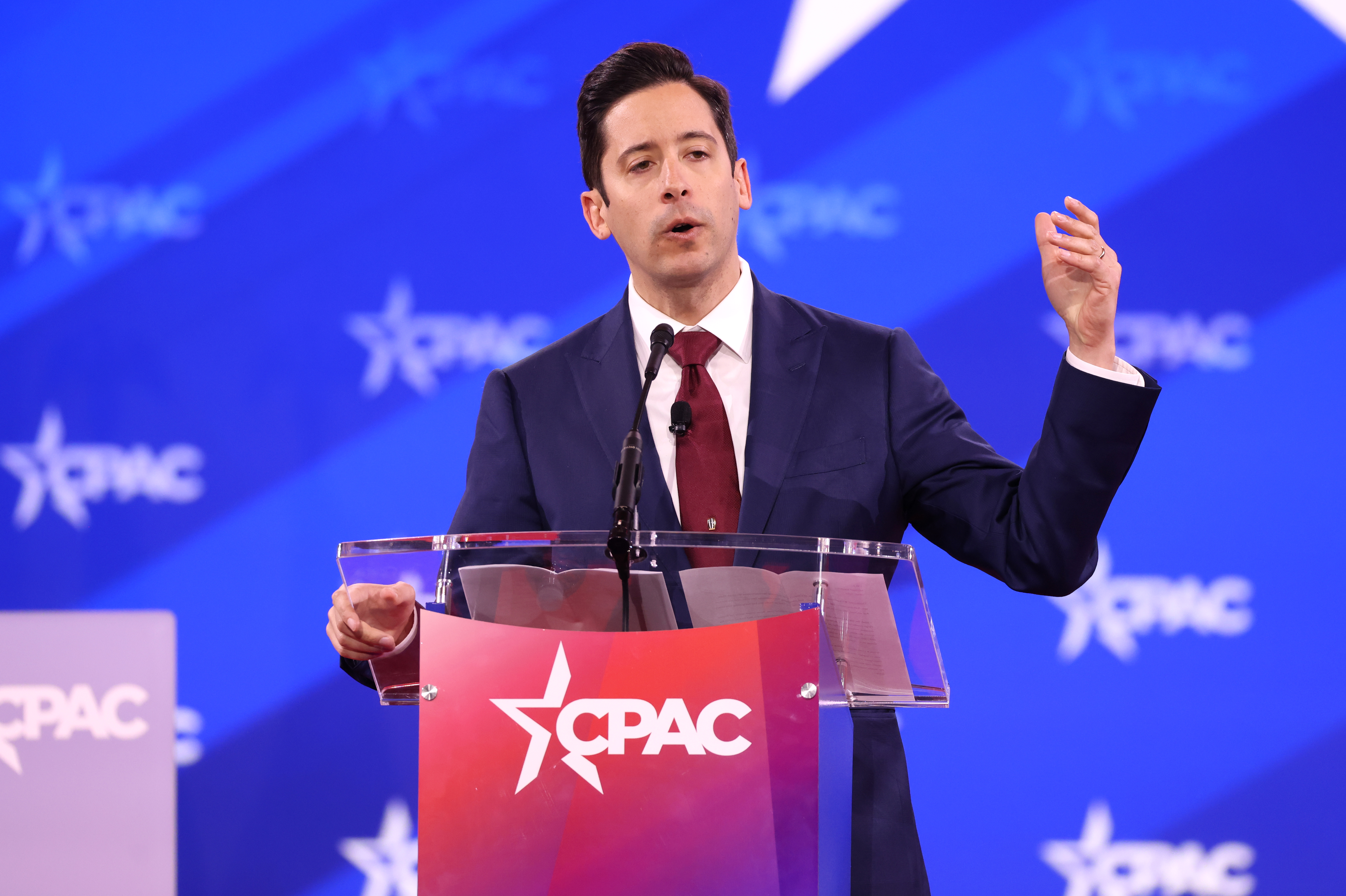
Commentator and author Michael Knowles

- Michael J. Astrue (party chairman, 1975; YPU president, 1977), former commissioner of the Social Security Administration
- David Frum, journalist, speechwriter, commentator, and author
- Keith Ferrazzi (party chairman, 1985), author of Never Eat Alone
- Michael J. Knowles, actor, author, and political commentator
- Jim O'Neill (investor), speechwriter and co-founder of the Thiel Fellowship
- Patrick F. Philbin (party chairman, spring 1988), deputy White House counsel and assistant attorney general.
- Lauren Willig (party chairman, spring 1998), New York Times bestselling author of historical romance fiction novels

=== Party of the Right ===
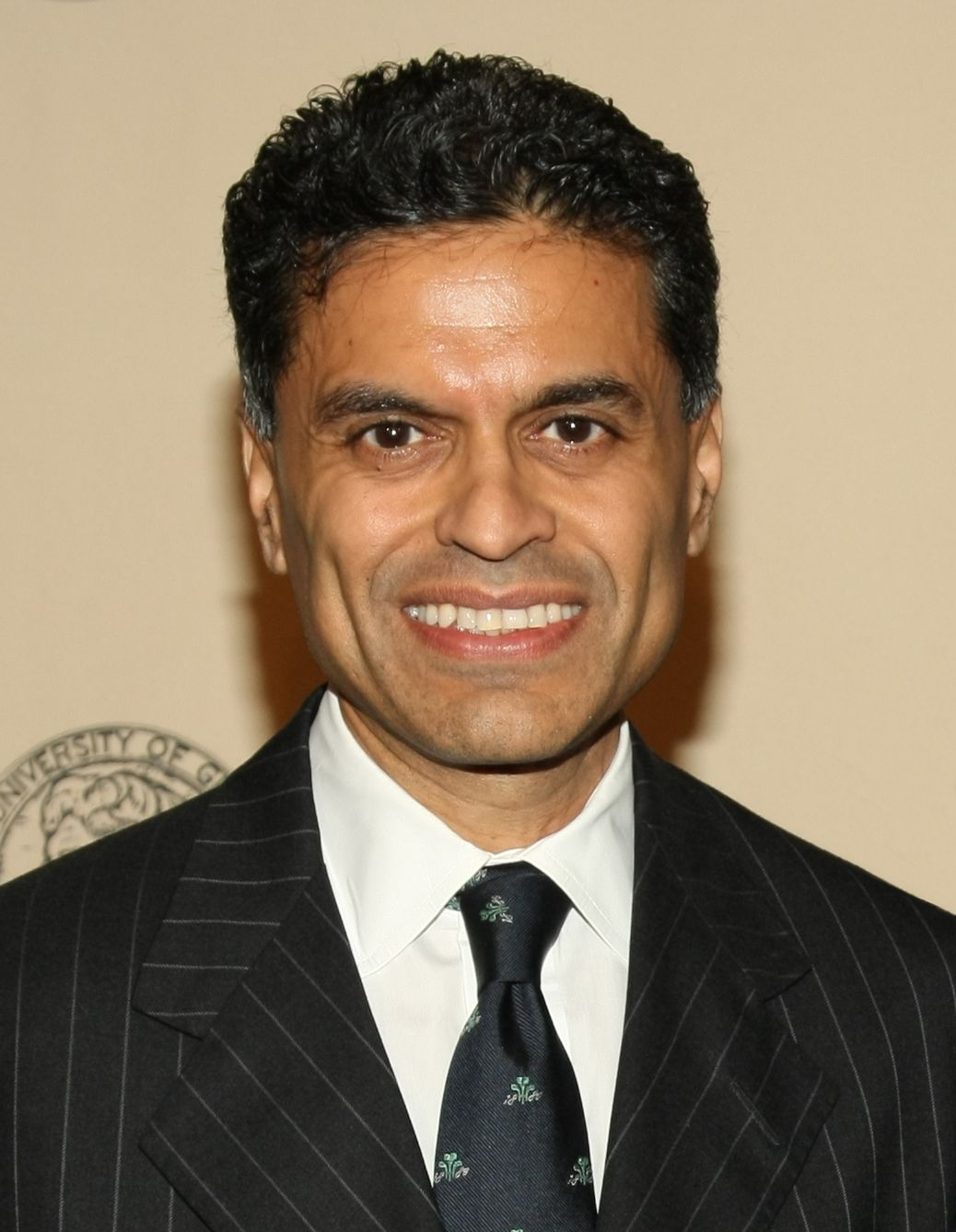
Former YPU president Fareed Zakaria

- Helen Andrews, political commentator and author
- Richard S. Arnold (YPU vice president, fall 1955), former judge for the United States Court of Appeals for the Eighth Circuit
- Richard Brookhiser (party chair, spring 1975), author and senior editor at National Review.
- Brian Carney, member of the editorial board at The Wall Street Journal
- Richard Cowan (party chair, autumn 1960), co-founder of Freedom Leaf, Inc., editor in chief of Freedom Leaf Magazine, and former director of the National Organization for the Reform of Marijuana Laws (NORML)
- Maggie Gallagher (party chair, spring 1981), president of the National Organization for Marriage
- Paul Gottfried, former professor at Elizabethtown College
- Peter Keisler (party chair, autumn 1979; speaker), co-founder of the Federalist Society
- Walter Olson (party chair, spring 1974), senior fellow at the Cato Institute
- Eugene B. Meyer (party chair, autumn 1974), president of the Federalist Society
- Robert Pollock (party chair, autumn 1993), member of the editorial board at The Wall Street Journal
- Grover J. Rees III (party chair, spring 1971), United States ambassador to the Democratic Republic of East Timor
- Jerry Smith (party chair, fall 1967), judge for the United States Court of Appeals for the Fifth Circuit
- Matthias Storme, professor of law at Catholic University Leuven
- Fareed Zakaria (YPU president, spring 1984), editor-at-large of Time
- Eve Tushnet, Lesbian Roman Catholic author and speaker

== Related ==
- List of Yale University student organizations
- Yale International Relations Association
- Yale Debate Association
- Berkeley Forum
