= Tönissteiner Kreis e.V. =

The Tönissteiner Kreis e.V. (TK) is a network of top ranking leaders in business, academia and politics with a strong international background and interest. It is nonpartisan, interdisciplinary and intergenerational. The TK is a forum for international dialogue and aspires to address society's challenges, supported by pro-bono and non-profit work.

Purpose:

- Promoting a higher degree of international connectivity in education, training and human resources management in Germany

- Supporting highly qualified junior talent in their international outreach and network

- Strengthening Germany's global reach and its innovative capacity

Board of Trustees: Tanja Gönner (Chair), Federation of German Industries (BDI)

Managing Director: Bernhard Ney

Founding year: 1958

== History ==
In 1958 the discussion group "Forum for Science and Business" was set up by the Federation of German Industry (BDI), the Employers Federation (BDA) the Association of German Chambers of Industry and Commerce (DIHK), the German Academic Exchange Service (DAAD) and the Association of German Foundations (Stifterverband für die Deutsche Wissenschaft). Its aim was to develop new leadership for Germany's international representatives as well as the private and public sector including European and International Organisations. The Forum later became the Tönissteiner Kreis, named after the town of Bad Tönisstein in Germany where the first meetings of the Kreis took place.

In order to become more independent and effective in its activities, the Tönissteiner network changed its legal structure into a non-profit association (Gemeinnütziger Verein e.V.) in 2000. An administrative office with professional staff was established, focused on management and support of core activities, quality assurance and sustainable cooperation and coordination with members, project teams, external donors and peers. A network of international partners was established inside and outside of Germany.

== Finances ==
The Tönissteiner Kreis is a charitable association, which finances itself through membership fees, donations and sponsorship. Its main asset is the voluntary activity of more than 800 members worldwide. The core structure of the Kreis is fully funded by annual membership fees. To implement its project work the Kreis further relies on third party funding from itsmembers as well as from private business and the public sector.

== Activities ==
- Regional, national and international colloquia, roundtables and conferences to debate topics crucial for today's society, on an invitation-only basis

- Networking and cross border dialogue with decision-makers in Germany and worldwide

- Young leaders program and support for international young leadership talent including mentoring, coaching, sponsoring and scholarships. The main initiatives here are the Studierendenforum im Tönissteiner Kreis and the Schülerkolleg International. Both offer a program and training tailored to their target audience, namely pupils, university students and young professionals. They involve networking and cooperation with the highly skilled and experienced members of the Tönissteiner Kreis.

- Study trips worldwide, helping to identify challenges and opportunities of tomorrow

- Promoting a welcoming mentality for international students, researchers at risk, etc.

To support an inclusive international atmosphere and intercultural dialogue, all activities are held in German, French and English.

== Profile of the members ==
The Tönissteiner Kreis has more than 800 members, who are active globally in leading positions in business, the media, the EU and other international organizations, in federal and state ministries as well as in research and academia.

== Criteria for admission ==
- Age at time of application under 35 years

- Excellent academic credentials

- International experience in two different non-German speaking countries for at least a year each

- Fluency in German and English required, French is a positive in order to be able to follow the activities of the Tönissteiner Kreis

- Personal recommendation of a member or a cooperation partner, strong social engagement and willingness to support the activities and aims of the Kreis

== Official Website ==
Tönissteiner Kreis e.V.

== Social media ==
LinkedIn
