= Durham Union =

Debating society at Durham, England

Durham Union Society
- Emblem of the Durham Union
- Predecessor: Durham University Debating Society (1835–39)
- Formation: 1842
- Type: Student debating union
- Registration no.: 1094676
- Legal status: Registered charity
- Headquarters: The Pemberton Buildings, Durham, DH1 3RL
- President: Oliver Hughes, Stephenson College
- Affiliations: World Universities Debating Council
- Website: dus.org.uk
- Formerly called: Durham University Union (to 1873)

The Durham Union Society (DUS), commonly referred to as the Durham Union, is a debating society, founded in 1842, by the students at Durham University. It is the largest society associated with the university, with over 3,000 members in residence, and 10,000 worldwide, and is the fourth oldest continuously running debating society in the UK. The society is private, existing independently from the university, and is distinct from the Durham Students' Union.

The Durham Union has hosted prominent figures such as former prime ministers Boris Johnson and Theresa May, actors Michael Palin and Jeremy Irons, actresses Imelda Staunton and Maggie Smith, members of the House of Lords, Baron Winston and Baroness Grey-Thompson, and television presenters Anton Du Beke and Jeremy Vine.

Previous presidents and members of the Union has gone on to hold prominence within the UK including former Secretary of State for Northern Ireland Mo Mowlam, former Lord Chancellor Robert Buckland, former Chief of the General Staff The Lord Dannatt, Dominic Johnson, the former co-chairman of the Conservative Party, and GB News presenter Tom Harwood.

== History ==
=== 19th century ===
The union was founded in 1842 as the Durham University Union along the same lines as the Cambridge Union (founded 1815) and the Oxford Union (founded 1823). An earlier Durham University Debating Society had existed from 1835–1839, with financial support from the university. These societies were not just for debating but were also clubs, and thus maintained facilities such as reading and dining rooms in addition to holding debates. After the establishment of the Durham Union, no further student debating societies were established upon these lines. Durham also followed Oxford in adopting parliamentary procedures in its debates from the initial foundation in 1835, which Cambridge also adopted in 1842 and which became standard in debating societies later in the 19th century. Few records remain from the mid 19th century, but the Oxford Union's records show that the Durham Union was operating in 1856. Records improve from 1872, when it was noted in the minute book that the society had been "revived", with it adopting the current name of Durham Union Society the following year, but no records from meetings prior to 1885 have survived. In 1873, Durham participated in the jubilee celebrations for the Oxford Union Society.

The society moved to a site adjacent to the university library on Palace Green in 1872. However, lacking the independent funds of the Oxford and Cambridge unions or the central funding of the debating societies at the redbrick universities, it was unable to maintain its buildings, which decayed to such a state by 1896 that it was no longer possible to hold debates. By this time, students' unions had begun to be established in redbrick universities such as Liverpool, and Durham University extended an offer to the union society to convert it into a students' union that would receive funding from the university. However, the union members rejected this offer and decided to remain independent, leading to the foundation of the separate Student Representative Council and continued poverty for the union society.

In the late the nineteenth century debates, like the curriculum, often revolved around ecclesiastical matters. At the time, the influence of the dean and chapter governing Durham Cathedral was significant, and the student intake at the university included large numbers of young men preparing for holy orders. The few political debates tending to concern the then-contentious issue of Irish Home Rule. Some debates were tongue-in-cheek, such as an 1887 motion 'That in the opinion of this House the Fair Sex is the root of all evil' – a proposal eventually defeated by a large majority. The first 'Ladies night', where female students were able to participate, was held in 1895. In 1900, as the Boer War raged, members sent a telegram congratulating Messrs. Tuckey and Macpherson (Note: Presumably the Reverend Ewen George Fitzroy Macpherson (BA, 1887), and the Reverend James Grove White Tuckey (a Trinity College, Oxford graduate who was a university lecturer and later chaplain of University College), both of whom were in South Africa serving as Chaplain to the Forces) – both former Durham Union men who had been trapped in the city of Ladysmith as it came under siege from Boer forces – on finally being relieved, and soon received a reply from the pair of them.

=== 20th century ===
Political debates became more frequent in the early twentieth century. Society members almost invariably sided with the positions of the Conservative Party. A debate in 1901 saw Lord Salisbury's third administration receive a vote of confidence of more than 90 per cent. In 1905, 1907, and again in 1911, the policies of the Liberal Party were rejected by majorities of more than 70 per cent. Opinions on immigration were not consistent, with students in 1903 "widely applauding" anti-immigration views in one term and rejecting similar motions by a majority of five to one in the following term.

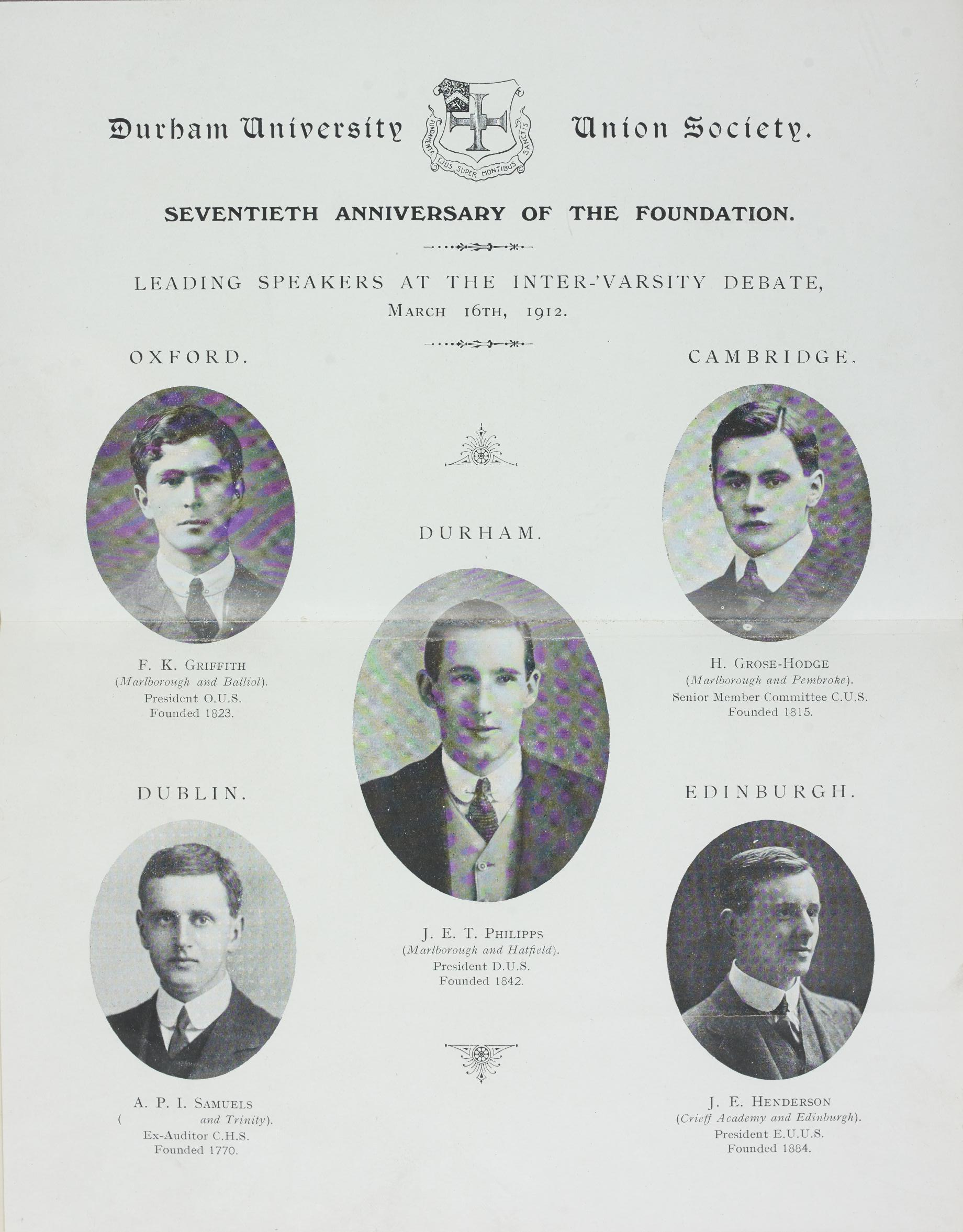
Participants in the 1912 Anniversary Inter-University Debate

To mark the 70th anniversary of the Durham Union, an inter-varsity debate chaired by then President J. E. T. Philipps, was held on Saturday 16 March 1912 at the Great Hall of University College, and featured visiting teams from Oxford, Cambridge, Trinity College, Dublin, and Edinburgh University – with the burning issue of Irish Home Rule as the subject of discussion. This was something of a reunion for three of the participants: Philipps, F. K. Griffith (President of the Oxford Union), and H. Grose–Hodge (from the Cambridge Union) were all schoolmates in the same form at Marlborough College. The union also backed campaigns for women's suffrage and a Women's Union was started at 44 North Bailey in 1914. This would continue as a separate entity, with the two unions segregated by sex, for almost half a century before a decision to merge was made 1959, with the Durham Union being fully integrated by 1964.

A Junior Union Society (now Newcastle University Students' Union) was established in Newcastle in 1881, and from 1914 to 1925 the Newcastle Union Society and the Durham Union Society operated as a single body, with the president being chosen alternately from the Durham and Newcastle divisions of the university. This ended after the construction of a new union building in Newcastle.

By the university's centenary in 1932, the union had reciprocal relationships with Oxford, Cambridge, Dublin, Edinburgh and Manchester. In 1936, the union moved into facilities provided by the university and, in 1977, moved to the Pemberton Building on the opposite side of Palace Green, where it remains. This was controversial as the union became dependent, unlike the Oxford and Cambridge unions, on the university for its facilities. Bertie Dockerill, an academic who has written on the history of student debating societies, emphasises that continued use of university-owned facilities:

has remained dependent upon the University believing that they were necessary, a system of landlordism that has not served the DUS well. The Union has been forcibly removed from its original home upon the library side of Palace Green that it had been gifted by the Warden of the University in 1873 (it now houses a lavatory complex), had its artwork appropriated, its coffee shop and dining room confiscated, and enjoys neither a library nor sole usage of its debating chamber, the latter commandeered daily by the University for lectures

To get around the limitations of its premises, the society traded its ownership of 44 North Bailey opposite Hatfield College for the old site of St Aidan's Society at 24 North Bailey in 1964, following the integration of the Women's Union. This allowed the union to return to its original establishment as both a debating society and a club, with the creation of the 'North Bailey Club' (informally known as '24' from the address). This contains a bar which is open to all Durham Union members; a snooker room; a reading room that the Durham Union uses for functions, such as post debate entertaining, and an en-suite guest room that can be hired out by members. Student members also have the opportunity to rent bedrooms as student accommodation.

=== 21st century ===
In 2010, the union was forced to cancel a debate on multiculturalism on safety grounds, after the National Union of Students' Black Students Officer Bell Ribeiro-Addy and LGBT Officer Daf Adley sent a letter to the union, Durham University and Durham Students Union. The letter opposed the invitation of then BNP MEP Andrew Brons, and warned of a “colossal demonstration” if the debate went ahead. It went on to say “If any students are hurt in and around this event, responsibility will lie with you.” Following a backlash, NUS President Wes Streeting appeared before the Durham Union to apologise for the actions of the officers concerned and a significant number of Durham students protested outside the debating chamber. An anti-censorship protest group on Facebook quickly amassed over 2,500 members, and a petition calling for a referendum on disaffiliation from the NUS was lodged with Durham Students' Union. A referendum was subsequently held in March 2010, with students voting to disaffiliate. A little under a year later, Durham Students' Union held a further referendum, which voted to re-affiliate with the NUS.

In October 2015, President Napat Rungsrithananon invited Tommy Robinson to the society with Robinson himself appearing to confirm his upcoming appearance on X (formally Twitter). However, the event was cancelled after the university "urged the cancellation of a speech" by Robinson. Robinson expressed his frustrations via X, saying "Free speech is dead."

After winning a Durham Union debate in 2017, Spectator columnist James Delingpole wrote that "For a real Oxbridge education, you now have to go to Durham", claiming that Oxford and Cambridge had become "a sterile, conformist, PC monoculture of earnest state-indoctrinated Stakhanovites". In contrast, Toby Young branded the union "a gang of left-wing thugs" after taking part in a debate in 2019.

In 2017, the Chinese Embassy in London attempted to block supermodel and activist Anastasia Lin from speaking in a debate. An official at the embassy warned the union that the debate, which also featured former Foreign Secretary Sir Malcolm Rifkind, could damage relations between the UK and China. Union president Tom Harwood insisted that "Everyone has been very polite", and the debate went ahead as planned. This was cited internationally as an example of attempts by the Chinese government to censor debate in the West.

In a December 2020 members' referendum, Durham Union Debating, the student competitive debate wing of the Durham Union, voted to leave the Durham Union Society, and affiliate with the Durham Students' Union as the independent Durham Debating Society. In June 2022, the Durham Debating Society voted to reverse this decision and re-affiliate with the Durham Union Society, leaving the Durham Students' Union.

An article in The Times in 2022, in the run-up to the Higher Education (Freedom of Speech) Bill, said that free speech at universities was being constrained by 'quiet no-platforming' by student debating societies. The Durham Union made a joint statement with the Oxford and Cambridge unions (which The Times declined to publish) rejecting the allegations and reaffirming that "the discussion of complex, sometimes controversial, topics should not only be encouraged but is an essential element of any free, progressive society".

In June 2024, a debate on the topic "This house believes Palestinian leadership is the biggest barrier to peace" was postponed by the university at short notice on police advice due to a threat to public safety from pro-Palestine protesters, who were blocking the entrances to the building, adjacent to the on-going protest camp on Palace Green. An anonymous union member and one of the invited speakers told journalists that the university had chosen not to use the police to force the protestors to move. The rescheduled debate was held that November in a lecture theatre in the university's Elvet Riverside complex, with one protestor arrested at the entrance to the Pemberton Buildings (before the change of venue was made known) and later released without charge. The proposition was carried 92–59.

The Daily Telegraph reported in October 2024 that the Durham Union had been blocked from taking part in the freshers' fair organised by Durham Students' Union. This was claimed by a free speech group, the Free Speech Union, to be due to political bias with the group's leader, Toby Young, saying that the university was violating its legal duty to ensure free speech. However, Durham Union stated that the university had complied with its free speech duties by providing them with an alternative venue. Durham Students' Union stated that the block on Durham Union's participation in the freshers' fair was in accordance with the agreement last year that future participation would be conditional on Durham Union improving its record on equality, diversity and inclusion.

In June 2026, the society hosted journalist and gender-critical activist Helen Joyce. The invitation was criticised by Durham Students' Union and Durham SU Trans Association, who called the decision "irresponsible and uncaring". In January 2026, the Durham Union's standing committee had voted nine to one in disagreement with the president's decision to invite Joyce. Joyce subsequently wrote that the event had proceeded smoothly and praised president Edward Tye for maintaining the invitation despite the internal pressure.

== Governance ==
The day-to-day management of the Durham Union is conducted by the standing committee, which consists of:

- The president
- The immediate president-elect
- The full officers (the secretary, treasurer, custodian, social secretary, equalities officer, publicity officer, director of debating, and the debating treasurer)

Management of the society's office and bar are handled by the office manager.

=== Elections ===
The full officers are elected yearly by the general committee. For the majority of offices, candidates must be past or present members of the general committee who have held office for at least 30 days. The offices of director of debating and debating treasurer are elected at debate training sessions.

=== Membership ===
There are four categories of membership: life membership; yearly membership; associate membership and honorary membership. The majority of members are life members; eligibility for life membership is restricted to current students, staff, and alumni of Durham University. Associate membership is offered to individuals without a formal connection to Durham University, while honorary membership may be conferred by the society in recognition of distinguished service or contribution.

Members of the Durham Union enjoy reciprocal relations with the Oxford Union, the Cambridge Union, the College Historical Society of Trinity College Dublin, the Philosophical Society of University College Dublin, the Philosophical Society of University College Cork, the Edinburgh University Debates Union and the St Andrews Union Debating Society.

== The union today ==
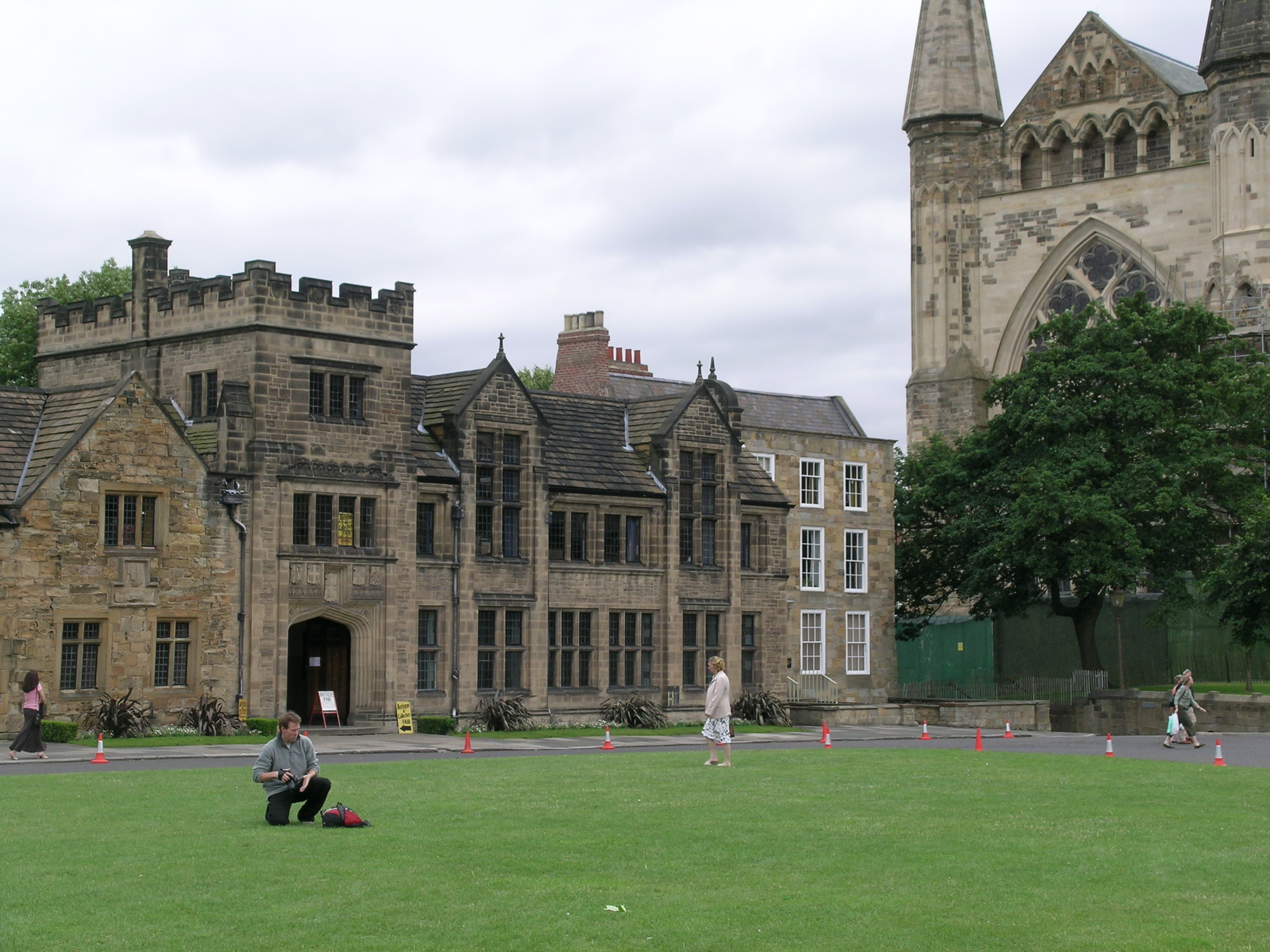
The Union Society's offices on Palace Green are shown in the centre of the image. To the right is the Department of Theology and Durham Cathedral

The Durham Union still maintains its offices and debating chamber on Palace Green within the Durham Castle and Cathedral World Heritage Site, as well as 24 North Bailey. It hosts weekly debates featuring prominent external speakers, as well as inviting address speakers and holding social events.

The social highlight of the year is the annual ball held in Michaelmas term. The programme for the evening varies, but usually consists of a champagne reception, dinner, music, and after dinner dancing. The union also holds members only socials, with recent events including a 'Halloween Social', 'American Election Social', 'Chinese New Year Social' and 'Valentines Social'.

=== Legal status ===
The Durham Union is legally, a registered charity in England and Wales. According to its constitution, the ownership of the society is vested in its trustees, who have ultimate authority over the society, subject to the deed of trust.

Although membership of the Durham Union is almost exclusive to students from Durham University, the Durham Union exists independently from the university and the Durham Students' Union.

=== Competitive debating ===
The union won the European Universities Debating Championship in 2005, and more recently has had teams reach the final of the European Championship, Oxford IV, Cambridge IV and John Smith Memorial Mace and the quarter-final of the World Universities Debating Championship. It also hosted the Durham Intervarsity competition, the Durham Open and Durham Schools, the world's largest residential school's debating competition.

In the 2012 world university debate rankings, the Durham Union ranked eleventh overall and fourth among teams from the UK, behind the Cambridge Union, Oxford Union and University of London Union (now defunct).

== Notable members ==
- Mo Mowlam MP (past secretary; Labour Minister of State, most famous for her work on the Good Friday Agreement)
- Crispin Blunt MP (past president; Conservative MP for Reigate and Minister of State)
- Carla Denyer MP (past member; Green MP for Bristol Central an co-leader of the Green Party of England and Wales)
- Richard Dannatt (past president (Michaelmas 1974); former Chief of the General Staff)
- Mark Elliott (past president; author of several books on Azerbaijan and travel in Asia)
- Sir Edward Leigh MP (past president; Conservative MP for Gainsborough and former chair of the Public Accounts Committee)
- Caroline Swift (past president; former High Court Judge)
- Gabby Logan (past assistant sponsorship secretary; BBC sports presenter and contestant on BBC1's Strictly Come Dancing 2007)
- Giles Ramsay (past president (Easter 1987); founding artistic director of the Trident Theatre)
- Baroness Hayter of Kentish Town (past member; former general secretary of the Fabian Society)
- Richard Blackburn (past president; former Bishop of Warrington in the Church of England)
- Jonathan Wilks (past president (Easter 1989); former UK Ambassador to Iraq, Oman, and Yemen)
- Sir Robert Buckland (past president (Michaelmas 1989); former Lord Chancellor)
- Dominic Johnson (past secretary; former co-chair of the Conservative Party)
- Huw Merriman (past president (Epiphany 1994); former Minister of State for Rail and HS2)
- Kumar Iyer (past president (Epiphany 1999); UK Ambassador and Permanent Representative to the United Nations)
- John Inge (past secretary; former Bishop of Worcester)
- Tracy Philipps (past president (Epiphany 1912); commissioner in Colonial Service and conservationist)
- Tom Harwood (past president (Epiphany 2017); journalist for Guido Fawkes and GB News)

== See also ==
- Cambridge Union
- Oxford Union
- York Dialectic Union
