= World Schools Style debate =

Combination of the British Parliamentary and Australia-Asian debating formats

World Schools Style debate (alternatively WSS, WS, or WSD) is one of the most widely used debate formats in secondary schools. It was designed in 1988 to be used at the World Schools Debating Championships (WSDC), but became a global standard for secondary school debate as WSDC gained popularity. WS is most similar to British Parliamentary, Australasian, and Karl Popper debate formats. The rules of WS are contained in the WSDC rulebook, with other users of the format explicitly using these rules at their competitions (e.g. EuroSDC). The interpretation of these rules differs across various historic and geographic contexts, leading to frequent clarifications and adaptations at the WSDC.

a World Schools style debater during a debate, speeches are typically 8 minutes.

Each debate comprises eight speeches delivered by two teams of three members, representing the Proposition and Opposition. One team is in favour of a debate motion, typically expressed as a statement beginning with "This House" (e.g. This House Would Ban Alcohol). When used internationally, the topics debated are generally relevant on a global scale, thus debaters are expected to consider the entire world in their examples and argumentation. The first six speeches are eight minutes in duration, with each team then finishing up by giving a four-minute concluding reply speech. In Impromptu debate, teams of three to five debaters are given 60 minutes to prepare for their speeches; in prepared debates, the motion is announced days to months before the debate to allow for research and preparation. At the WSDC, prepared motions are released 8 weeks before the competition. Notably, debaters can prepare for the latter with the help of their coaches, the internet, and any other resource, whereas they may only converse within the team for impromptu debates.

== Speaking order ==
1. First speaker of the Proposition
2. First speaker of the Opposition
3. Second speaker of the Proposition
4. Second speaker of the Opposition
5. Third speaker of the Proposition
6. Third speaker of the Opposition
7. Reply speaker of the Opposition
8. Reply speaker of the Proposition

== Role of each speaker ==
=== First speaker of the Proposition ===
The role of the first speaker is to open up the case of the proposition. This involves:

- Giving a status quo analysis when appropriate, to show the extent of the problem that side Proposition wants to solve.
- Defining the motion in order to prevent any confusion caused by the motion, especially when the motion may lack clarity. In the case of a motion involving the implementation of a policy, they must explain the Proposition model, including who implements it and how it will work. In motions involving solely value judgements, such as those based on societal narratives, the world in which Proposition is defending and that which the Opposition is defending is characterized.
- Presenting their side's opinion, or stance, and main arguments. The delivery of proposition's main substantive arguments takes up the bulk of speaking time, involving analysis on why a claim is true and why it matters in the debate.
- The analysis is supplemented by examples and evidence, especially in prepared debates where debaters may use resources such as books and the internet to find evidence. The arguments are often divided into principled arguments based on ethical principles such as utilitarianism, dignity or freedom, and practical arguments based on outcomes which ought to be seen as desirable.

=== First speaker of the Opposition ===
Their duty is to respond to the definition and arguments given by the Proposition while typically presenting a counter-case. This involves:

- If they disagree with the definition of the motion the Proposition gives, providing a counter-definition and arguing for why it is fairer or more likely to occur in reality. If the Proposition gives a model, they may present a counter-model which involves a different policy the Opposition would like to have enacted. This counter-model must be feasible using the same political, financial, social and other resources the Proposition is using for their model. The ability and extent to which models may be assumed as part of the debate based on the motion is known as fiat. If the Opposition does not defend a specific counter-model or counterfactual, they defend the status quo.
- Rebutting the arguments given by the Proposition, meaning to show why the claims of the other side are not, or cannot, be true.
- Explaining their side's main arguments. These arguments may be negative, presenting the harms which occur in the world Proposition is defending, or positive, presenting the benefits which occur in the world Opposition is defending.

=== Second speeches ===
Their role is to rebut the arguments given by the other side and respond to the rebuttal given by the other side, ensuring that their arguments still stand. They are allowed to introduce weighing metrics such as the scale, intensity, likelihood, consent, or moral importance of the impacts of an argument, by which that argument should be credited more by a judge than another argument. Eventually, they can continue with their team's case and must give new arguments.

=== Third speeches ===
The third speaker has to re-structure the whole debate, often along the lines of clashes or themes around which the debate has revolved, filter the key issues of the debate and prove that the other side's case does not stand while proving that their case does, convincing the judges to vote for their side. This involves:

- Responding to the new arguments from the other side's Second Speaker. This is especially important for the Third Speaker of Proposition as there is no other constructive speech for Proposition to respond to any arguments coming out of Second Speaker of Opposition's speech.
- Adding to and deepening the rebuttal of the other side's case, which can involve giving reasons for why their case is superior even if parts of the case of the other side are true, as well as pointing out strategic mistakes such as inconsistencies and contradictions on the other side.
- Rebuilding their side's arguments by rebutting the rebuttal, explaining how the other side failed to take down an argument and why the argument is still relevant to the debate. Notably, they are generally discouraged from presenting completely new constructive arguments, because the other side may not have the opportunity to respond.

=== Reply speeches ===
World Schools Style debates include an additional speech from each team called the reply. This is a short, four-minute speech given by either the first or second speaker from the team, and presented in the opposite speaking order to the rest of the debate (i.e. the Opposition delivers the first reply speech, followed by the Proposition). The functions of the reply speech are to:

- Outline the points of contention that the debate has centred on.
- Evaluate the course of the debate.
- Declare the reasoning of their team's victory based on their analysis.

The reply speech is sometimes referred to as being a "biased adjudication" of the debate, because its format is similar to that of an adjudicator's oral feedback on the debate, but with the purpose of convincing the audience that the speaker's team was victorious. The retrospective nature of the reply speech means that no new material may be introduced in this speech.

== Points of information ==
During any speech except the reply speeches, and not during the first and last minutes of the first six speeches, speaking members of the opposing team may offer points of information to briefly interject a point that the speaker must immediately respond to. The speaker holding the Floor is not obliged to accept all the points of information offered to them, but is likely to be marked down by adjudicators if they do not accept any. Speakers delivering points of information are expected to keep them to 15 seconds or less.

Although a speaker's points of information do not have a direct effect on their mark, a mechanism named the "POI Adjuster" has been introduced in recent years: when the quality of a speaker's POIs is significantly different (better or worse) from the quality of their speech, the judge may add or subtract one or two marks from their overall speaker score.

== Adjudication ==
World Schools Style debates are adjudicated based on three metrics: Content, Style and Strategy, of which the former two each make up 40% of the judge's decision and the final 20%. The judging is silent and non-conferral; judges first vote on the team they believe won the debate independently before then discussing the oral adjudication (OA), which the chair judge delivers to both teams to justify their decision.

When submitting their ballots, judges decide on the number of speaker points they wish to give to each speaker, rating their speech based on the three categories mentioned above. The scale for speaker points for constructive speeches ranges from 60 to 80, with 70 points representing an average speech. Reply speeches range from 30 to 40 points, typically averaging at 35. The full range of speaker points is rarely, if ever used; for example, no best speaker at the World Schools Debating Championships in the past 5 years has averaged more than 75 speaker points for constructive 8-minute speeches. The winning team must have more total speaker points than the other team.

Split decisions may occur when judges come to different conclusions on the winner of the debate. The team with the most ballots wins the debate whilst every team receives a number of ballots based on the number of judges which voted for them. In tournaments, this is used to further rank teams of equal numbers of wins in the inrounds of tournaments, determining which teams may progress to the outrounds. If both sides receive an equal number of votes, the chair judge's ballot breaks the tie to decide the winning team.

Since 2023, conferral adjudication has become common. This process involved a brief discussion between adjudicators on how they saw the debate, but they do not have to reach a unanimous decision. This is designed to ensure no judge has overlooked key elements of the debate. Panels at WSDC are made up of judges of varying experience levels, so this process can be particularly valuable if a less experienced adjudicator has overlooked elements of the debate. Adjudicators also confer on overall debate quality before submitting ballots.

== Variations ==
The World Schools Style of debating is used not only at the World Schools Debating Championships, but also at a number of national and regional high school-level debating competitions around the world. At some of these tournaments, the format is varied slightly. For example, at some competitions, the length of speeches is reduced to five or six minutes for main speeches and three minutes for reply speeches. Some tournaments intended for novice-level debaters also do not allow Points of Information.

In the early years of the World Schools Debating Championships, there was a two-minute break between the main speeches and the reply speeches to allow the team members to confer, though this is no longer the case. However, some national or regional World Schools Style tournaments still have this two-minute break, and in some cases members of the team's squad for the competition who do not speak in the debate are allowed to come out of the audience to confer with the speakers during these two minutes.

== See also ==
- Debate
- Eurasian Schools Debating Championship (ESDC)
- Heart of Europe Debating Tournament
- Parliamentary style debate
- World Schools Debating Championships
