= Heart of Europe Debating Tournament =

Debate tournament

Heart of Europe International Debating Tournament

General Information
- Established: 2001 by John L. Wickham
- Website: www.heart-of-europe.org
- Location: Olomouc, Czech Republic
- Key people: Jakub Kadlec, Chief Organiser
- Focus: World Schools Style Debating

Other tournament networks
- Facebook: Heart-of-Europe-Debating-Tournament-Official-Site
- Twitter: @HeartofEuropeDT
- Vkontakte: hoedt
- You Tube: theczechdebatetv
- Flicker: 76287098@N04
- U Stream: HeartofEuropeTV
- Linkedin: Heart-Europe-7447844
- HASHTAG: HOEDT

The Heart of Europe International Debating Tournament (HOE DT) is an annual debating tournament for high school-level teams which is held in English.

== History ==
The Heart of Europe Debating Tournament is a WSDC (World Schools Debating Championships) based international debate tournament founded by John L. Wickham and the students of Olomouc - Hejcin High School. Originally a competition for high school students of European countries that had previously participated in the KPDP (Karl Popper Debate Program) established by OSI (Open Society Institute), after some time it became a truly global competition for high school debaters. The first Heart of Europe Debating Tournament was held in Olomouc, Czech Republic in 2001. The event attracted participants from Hungary, Slovakia and the Czech Republic. In 2002, there was no tournament because the necessary funding was not found. However, a year later, in 2003, the tournament was held again. It has since been hosted annually in Olomouc, Czech Republic. The event was organised by Debate Club Olomouc between 2004–2009. The Association of Debate Clubs of Olomouc Region took over the organisation in 2010.

The year 2010 was also the year when the tournament expanded its reach, with 17 countries participating, including South Africa and China.

In 2011 there was an improvement in the quality of the tournament. The organising committee worked in cooperation with Palacky University Olomouc. All the debates took place in the building of Faculty of Science. The tournament also received new visual style in this year and a lot of work on promotion was done, including new social networks, photo and video documentation. New participating countries were Moldova, Montenegro, Russia, Singapore and Sweden.

Year 2012 was the greatest cornerstone in the history of the tournament. It was held by a new organization, Czech Debate Society, o. s.. For the first time, the tournament was also available online to participants all around the world because of the project "Heart of Europe accessible to everyone". What more, one additional new project was connected with the promotion of the tournament, The Czech Debate TV, with purpose to monitor debate and educational events and present educational videos. The tournament enjoyed fruitful partnerships with projects Debating Europe and The Office of the Government of the Czech Republic - European Affairs Information Department. In that year we have yet again welcomed several new nations, namely Chile, Nigeria, Macedonia, as well as it was the 5th anniversary of Jakub Kadlec' involvement with the tournament.

2013 was the 10th anniversary of Heart of Europe and the tournament got its mascot Herr Heart. The biggest innovation of Heart of Europe 2013 was a test run of the British Parliamentary track before the high school competition, which proved to be a success and will be repeated in the future. As for the staff, the Chief Adjudicator panel was changed – extended to include judges from all over the planet in order to increase its diversity. There were also new participating countries (such as Croatia or Ukraine) and new partnerships made, mainly the one with Debate Club Pandora in Kiev, which later resulted in CDS helping with organization at their tournament called Under Chestnut Trees. Other new partners and sponsors included ARGO, ČEZ or Deleo. In terms of cultural program, Heart of Europe newly included a talent show, where everyone was invited to showcase any skill other than debating. Several debaters and judges performed singing, playing an instrument, dancing as well as some acting and stand up comedy. The next addition was a thematic tour of the city, which was special that year because of historical costumes and props used to demonstrate the legends of Olomouc. Additionally, registration to the tournament was tied to a blood donorship initiative.

Year 2014 was most notable by the outstanding quality of the teams, even by the already quite high standard of the tournament - perhaps a result of multiple delegations spending several years prior to 2014 honing their skills at our tournament every year. The teams were also extraordinarily balanced. In the first break round, the last team to make the break from the 16th place defeated the first team, two members of which were still the best two speakers of the whole tournament. The team with the best two speakers was from South Africa, just like the team that ultimately won the whole tournament, only from an entirely different institution, thus also continuing the regular cycle of different continent winning each year. This was also the first year after the definitive retirement of the founder of the tournament, John L. Wickham, from the position of Chief Judge, making it a bit of an experiment in new organizational procedures. The new paradigm for the future of the tournament was decided to be a rotating position of a chief judge, open to new ascending debate stars, as well as experienced debate masters. New participating countries were Bermuda, China and Denmark. Czech Debate Society, o. s. has changed name to Czech Debate Society, z. s. in accordance with new civil code.

Heart of Europe 2016 had again grown in size in 2016 to 40 teams, including some new additions to participating states like Argentina, Bosnia and Herzegovina, India, Peru, Qatar, and Spain. One of the ongoing trends that became especially apparent this time was the increase in the skill and experience level of the participating debaters. In part, this was happening because larger portion of the debaters were returning ones who have previously participated at Heart of Europe. At the same time, more high level international debaters were attracted to the tournament by its rising significance in the world debating circuit over the last couple of years. The motions debated in qualification rounds covered a range of topics from education, through women’s rights, to global economics. The grand final debate dealt with the issue of residual European colonialism, and it happened between the teams from Canada and Denmark, with the Canadians taking the prize.

Heart of Europe International DT has become very popular during past years. There have been participants from countries such as Argentina, Belarus, Bermuda, Bosnia and Herzegovina, Bulgaria, Canada, Chile, China, Croatia, Czech Republic, England, Estonia, Germany, Hong Kong, Hungary, India, Israel, Japan, Latvia, Lithuania, Macedonia, Moldova, Montenegro, Nigeria, Palestine, Peru, Qatar, Romania, Russia, Scotland, Serbia, Singapore, Slovakia, Slovenia, South Africa, South Korea, Spain, Sweden, Thailand, Turkey, Ukraine and United States of America.

All debates in the tournament are in English. This is for practical reasons, but it means that many countries debate in what is for them a foreign language. This has not stopped a number of these teams being very successful. Special awards have been introduced for the highest-ranked teams made-up of English-as-a-second-language (ESL) and English-as-a-foreign-language (EFL) speakers.

== Symbols ==
From December 2012, Heart of Europe Debating Tournament has an official mascot – Herr Heart! Then Chief Adjudicator of the tournament, John Wickham, commented on it:

Introducing this mascot and promoting blood giving all around the world is another significant milestone for the Czech Debate Society and the tournament itself. It is in line with the tournament’s mission to develop cooperation among the youth and to foster cultural and social understanding and exchange. Herr Heart represents the sharpness, love for freedom and effort to help and to improve the neighbourhood, which is essential for debaters, as well as the hospitality and openness of organisers and the tournament itself.

John Wickham also explained the concept behind the logo for the HOEDT, saying that the heart in the middle of the Europe silhouette represents the central position of the place, from where the HOEDT helps spread freedom of speech, the centre of Europe which really is a crossroad of cultures. The logo also indicates the communication that will bring the students from various cultures closer to each other.

The logo incorporates the national colors to symbolize vitality and democracy. The mascot, Herr Heart, introduces the motto "Debate Is Life" for both the tournament and its associated blood donor initiative. According to the organizing committee (HOEDT), the theme connects physical health with intellectual engagement and cross-cultural dialogue.

== Format ==
Heart of Europe Debating Tournament debates use a special format known as 'World Schools Style Debating'. This is a combination of the British Parliamentary and Australia-Asian debating, designed to meet the needs of the tournament. Each debate comprises eight- minute speeches delivered by two three-member teams (the Proposition and the Opposition). Each speaker delivers an eight-minute speech; then both teams deliver a "reply speech" lasting four minutes, with the last word being reserved for the Proposition. Between the end of the first and the beginning of the last minute of an eight-minute speech, the opposing party may offer "points of information". The speaker may refuse these, but should take at least one or two points during his or her speech.

Originally the plan was to use KPDP style of debate at Heart of Europe Debating Tournament. However, 'World Schools Style Debating' was used in many more countries for their national competitions, including Australia, Argentina, Germany, Greece, Indonesia, Israel, New Zealand, South Africa, Slovenia, Singapore, South Korea, Sri Lanka and Wales, so the Organizing Committee has decided to use it.

The HOE DT normally takes place over the course of seven days. Each national team competes in eight preliminary debates: four prepared debates and four impromptu debates (for which teams have one hour to prepare). Once the eight preliminary rounds have been completed, the 16 best teams compete in knock-out debates (known as the Octofinals) culminating in a Grand Final. For each debate, three judges (or more in later rounds) mark each debater on his or her style, content and strategy.

== British Parliamentary Track ==
The British Parliamentary Track of the Heart of Europe international debating tournament was first introduced in 2013, the 10th anniversary of the event. It took place between 29 July and 1 August 2013 and it was an international debating competition for university students in the most common format for this type of contest – the British Parliamentary debating, involving 4 teams of two university students in a single debate, representing two governments (affirming the motion) and two oppositions (negating the motion). The Chief Judge was Martin Rezny from the Czech Republic and the winning team was from Sweden.

In 2014, BP track was led by one of the winners of last year's BP track, Alexander Mäkela from Sweden, who introduced a special kind of motion for the last preliminary round – a hypothetical fictional scenario. Given the positive reception of the motion (in this case dealing with alien invasion), the experiment will likely turn into a tradition in the future years. There were 12 teams participating and the winning team was once again from Sweden.

The BP Track in 2015 has almost doubled in size since previous year including two new nations (Thailand and Great Britain), and the Chief Judge was once again Martin Rezny from the Czech Republic. The fictional scenario motion was about zombie apocalypse this time around, and even the real world motions shifted towards more unusual topics, such as astrology or robotics. The positive reception of this focus will therefore likely also become a trend at this event. The winning team was from Great Britain, the best speaker being Duncan Crowe, who just weeks after this event became a finalist of the EUDC 2015 in Vienna as well.

=== Participating countries ===
- Canada 2013;2014;2015
- Czech Republic 2013;2014;2015
- Netherlands 2013
- Poland 2014
- Romania 2013
- Slovakia 2014
- Slovenia 2013;2014,2015;2018;2019
- South Africa 2014,2015
- Sweden 2013;2014
- Thailand 2015
- United Kingdom 2015
- South Korea 2019

== Chief Adjudication Team ==
The Chief Adjudication Team (CAT) of HOEDT is selected by the Chief Judge with the help of the Chief Organizer. The number of members may vary, though an odd number is more practical in terms of the CAT assembling a functional judging panel. While the principles behind the selection of the CAT members may vary as well, the CAT should consist of experienced judges of international tournaments in appropriate debate formats. In 2013, a new convention was established by extending the CAT to 5 members, each ideally representing a different region of the world.

=== 2013 Chief Adjudication Team ===
Year	Surname	Name	Country	Position
2013	Wickham	John L.	United Kingdom	Head of CAP
2013	Polsak	Aljosa	Slovenia	Member of CAP Tabulation Officer
2013	Mohanoe	Itumeleng Kenneth	South Africa	Member of CAP
2013	Sovaiala	Nae	Romania	Member of CAP
2013	Cena	Frankie	Canada	Member of CAP

=== 2014 Chief Adjudication Team ===
Year	Surname	Name	Country	Position
2014	Chalabi	Wissam	Sweden	Head of CAP
2014	Cvikl	Eva Nike	Slovenia	Member of CAP
2014	Mohanoe	Itumeleng Kenneth	South Africa	Member of CAP
2014	Belafi	Carmen	Germany	Member of CAP
2014	Cena	Frankie	Canada	Member of CAP

=== 2015 Chief Adjudication Team ===
Year	Surname	Name	Country	Position
2015	Mohanoe	Itumeleng Kenneth	South Africa	Head of CAP
2015	Cena	Frankie	Canada	Member of CAP
2015	Ivanovski	Petar	North Macedonia	Member of CAP

=== 2016 Chief Adjudication Team ===
Year	Surname	Name	Country	Position
2016	Mohanoe	Itumeleng Kenneth	South Africa	Head of CAP
2016	Tabyanian	Dena	Canada	Member of CAP
2016	Krawczyk	Laura	Poland	Member of CAP
2016	Mazilu	Simona Anca	Romania	Member of CAP
2016	Vildosola	Delfina Maria	Argentina	Member of CAP

== Organising Committee ==
The Heart of Europe Debating Tournament is governed by the Organising Committee, which is nominated by Executive Board of Czech Debate Society (CDS) and is made up of representatives and members of CDS and volunteers. Decisions are made by democratic votes of the Organising Committee members. The Organising Committee decides which town in Czech Republic will host the tournament, monitors and revises the HOE DT rules, handles matters such as adjudication, language issues, education and finance. Since 2010 till 2012 the procedure was run by Association of Debate Clubs Olomouc Region.

There is a Code of Ethics of HOE DT which contains the aims of the tournament and three basic principles. The principles ensure that there is no censorship of motions for debate, and that all teams take part on an equal basis. All participants and all hosts must agree to abide by the Code of Ethics before taking part.

=== 2012 Organising Committee ===
Year	Surname	Name	Country	Position
2012	Kadlec	Jakub	Czech Republic	Chief Organiser Head of Association of Debate Clubs of Olomouc Region Finance Visas Motion Committee Member of CAP
2012	Wickham L.	John	United Kingdom	Head of Chief Adjudicator' Panel (CAP) Motion Committee
2012	Polsak	Aljosa	Slovenia	Tabulation Officer Member of CAP
2012	Bc. Machacek	Lukas	Czech Republic	Registration Officer Motion Committee
2012	Cerna	Tereza	Czech Republic	Delegates Care and Logistics Officer
2012	Bc. Rezny	Martin	Czech Republic	PR & Media Officer
2012	Burget	Lukas	Czech Republic	Complaints Officer
2012	Ligurska	Klara	Czech Republic	Complaints Officer

=== 2013 Organising Committee ===
Year	Surname	Name	Country	Position
2013	Kadlec	Jakub	Czech Republic	Chief Organiser Chief Organiser Head of Czech Debate Society (CDS) Finance Visas Motion Committee
2013	Wickham L.	John	United Kingdom	Head of Chief Adjudicator' Panel (CAP) Motion Committee
2013	Polsak	Aljosa	Slovenia	Tabulation Officer Member of CAP
2013	Bradac	Jiri	Czech Republic	Registration Officer Motion Committee
2013	Cerna	Tereza	Czech Republic	Delegates Care
2013	Sladky	Jakub	Czech Republic	Logistics Officer Project Manager of Czech Debate Society (CDS)
2013	Bc. Rezny	Martin	Czech Republic	PR & Media Officer
2013	Burget	Lukas	Czech Republic	Complaints Officer
2013	Ligurska	Klara	Czech Republic	Complaints Officer Member of Registration Team

=== 2014 Organising Committee ===
Year	Surname	Name	Country	Position
2014	Kadlec	Jakub	Czech Republic	Chief Organiser Head of Czech Debate Sociaety (CDS) Finance Visas Motion Committee Member of Registration Team
2014	Chalabi.	Wissam	Sweden	Head of Chief Adjudicator' Panel (CAP) Motion Committee
2014	Polsak	Aljosa	Slovenia	Tabulation Officer
2014	Fink	Jernej	Slovenia	Tabulation Officer
2014	Bc. Machacek	Lukas	Czech Republic	Registration Officer Motion Committee
2014	Cerna	Tereza	Czech Republic	Delegates Care
2014	Tichy	Antonin	Czech Republic	Socials Officer
2014	Dankova	Denisa	Czech Republic	Logistics Officer & Catering Officer
2014	Bc. Rezny	Martin	Czech Republic	Communications Officer
2014	Waic	Vlastimil	Czech Republic	Complaints Officer
2014	Ligurska	Klara	Czech Republic	Complaints Officer Member of Registration Team

=== 2015 Tournament Organising Committee ===
Year	Surname	Name	Country	Position
2015	Kadlec	Jakub	Czech Republic	Chief Organiser Head of Czech Debate Sociaety (CDS) Finance Housekeeping Visas Motion Committee Member of Registration Team
2015	Mohanoe	Itumeleng Kenneth	South Africa	Head of Chief Adjudicator' Panel (CAP) Motion Committee
2015	Klos	Stepan	Czech Republic	Tabulation Officer
2015	Azaz	Daniel	Slovenia	Tabulation Officer
2015	Waic	Vlastimil	Czech Republic	Registration Officer Project Manager of Czech Debate Society (CDS)
2015	Cerna	Tereza	Czech Republic	Delegates Care Officer
2015	Siwkova	Hana	Czech Republic	Socials Officer
2015	Dobes	Pavel	Czech Republic	Logistics Officer
2015	Dankova	Denisa	Czech Republic	Catering Officer
2015	Mgr. Rezny	Martin	Czech Republic	Communications Officer
2015	Sulc	Josef	Czech Republic	IT Administrator
2015	Ligurska	Klara	Czech Republic	Complaints Officer Member of Registration Team

=== The current 2016 Tournament Organising Committee ===
Year	Surname	Name	Country	Position
2016	Kadlec	Jakub	Czech Republic	Chief Organiser Head of Czech Debate Sociaety (CDS) Finance Housekeeping Visas Motion Committee Member of Registration Team
2016	Mohanoe	Itumeleng Kenneth	South Africa	Head of Chief Adjudicator' Panel (CAP) Motion Committee
2016	Klos	Stepan	Czech Republic	Tabulation Officer
2016	Azaz	Daniel	Slovenia	Tabulation Officer
2016	Waic	Vlastimil	Czech Republic	Registration Officer Complains Officer Project Manager of Czech Debate Society (CDS)
2016	Matylda	Klosova	Czech Republic	Delegates Care Officer
2016	Osypiuk	Gosia	Poland	Socials Officer
2016	Dobes	Pavel	Czech Republic	Logistics Officer Medical Officer
2016	Kuzminova	Veronika	Czech Republic	Catering Officer
2016	Mgr. Rezny	Martin	Czech Republic	Venue Manager
2016	Gardavsky	Ondrej	Czech Republic	PR & Media Officer
2016	Sulc	Josef	Czech Republic	IT Administrator
2016	Ligurska	Klara	Czech Republic	Complaints Officer Member of Registration Team

== Past tournaments ==
Year	Champions	Runners-up	Semi-finalists	Venue	Organizer	Chief Judge
2001	Czech Republic	Slovakia		Olomouc, Czech Republic	John L. Wickham	John L. Wickham
2003	United States	Czech Republic	Estonia	Olomouc, Czech Republic	John L. Wickham	John L. Wickham
2004	Hungary	Romania - Romania 1	Slovenia & Czech Republic - NAT	Olomouc, Czech Republic	Matej Pilat	John L. Wickham
2006				Olomouc, Czech Republic	Matej Pilat	John L. Wickham
2008	Israel - Israel	Romania - Romania 1		Olomouc, Czech Republic	Marek Stepan	John L. Wickham
2009	South Korea - KMLA	Slovenia - Slovenia A	Canada - Only one team & South Korea - Baumgardener	Olomouc, Czech Republic	Jakub Kadlec	John L. Wickham
2010	South Africa - South Africa	Hong Kong - Hong Kong 1	Canada - Bicostal & Czech Republic - ISP	Olomouc, Czech Republic	Michal Roubalik, Jakub Kadlec	John L. Wickham
2011	Czech Republic - Red	Turkey - Turkey	Singapore - Raffles Knights & Hong Kong - Hong Kong 1	Olomouc, Czech Republic	Jakub Kadlec, Bc. Roman Petr	George Yeoman
2012	Singapore - Raffles	Canada - Canada A	Canada - Canada West Canada - Canada East	Olomouc, Czech Republic	Jakub Kadlec	John L. Wickham
2013	Canada - Canada Red	United States - USA A	Turkey - Turkish National Slovenia - DGM Black	Olomouc, Czech Republic	Jakub Kadlec	John L. Wickham
2014	South Africa - South Africa A1	Canada - Canada Red	Romania - SAVA A Singapore - Raffles Knights	Olomouc, Czech Republic	Jakub Kadlec	Wissam Chalabi
2015	Canada - Canada Blue	Canada - Canada West	Canada - Canada Red Denmark - Denmark Red	Olomouc, Czech Republic	Jakub Kadlec	Itumeleng Kenneth Mohanoe
2016	Canada - UTS-A	Denmark - Denmark A	South Africa - BAD GOLD: DELUXE Canada - Canada Red	Olomouc, Czech Republic	Jakub Kadlec	Itumeleng Kenneth Mohanoe
2019	South Korea - Korea Blue	Bermuda - Independent Bermuda	England - RMS Bulgaria - BULGARIAN FOXES	Olomouc, Czech Republic	Jakub Kadlec; Matylda Klosova	Laura Krawczyk

== Future tournaments ==
British Parliamentary Styly (highschoolers and university students)

- July 11–13, 2017 - to be held in Olomouc, Czech Republic. Chief Organizer is Jakub Kadlec and Chief Adjudicator is going to be confirmed later.

World Style (highschoolers)

- July 13–18, 2017 - to be held in Olomouc, Czech Republic. Chief Organizer is Jakub Kadlec, Czech Republic and Chief Adjudicator is Simona Anca Mazilu from Romania. .

== The Goals ==
The Goals of Heart of Europe Debating Tournament are:

- to promote free speech;
- to nurture the skills of public speech and rhetorics;
- to develop cooperation among the youth;
- to advocate debate;
- to foster cultural and social understanding and exchange;
- to promote the Czech Republic and Olomouc Region;
- to contribute to education.

In order to further these aims, all participating countries agree that:

- The team of any participating country may be required to debate any issue.
- The team of any participating country may be required to debate against the team of any other participating country.
- The team of any participating country is entitled to take part in the tournament on the same basis as any other participating country's team.

== EFL awards ==
At Heart of Europe Debating Tournament special awards are presented each year to the best-performing English-as-a-Foreign-Language (EFL) teams. These awards are open to teams from nations where English is not an official national language. To be eligible for the EFL award, a team must be predominantly made-up of students who do not come from English-speaking homes and who do not attend schools where English is used as a medium of instruction. The EFL award was instituted in 2010. Prior to that, there was just one award for teams from non-English-speaking countries. Before 2010, the HOE DT rules stipulated that teams who reached the semi-finals or Grand Final of the championship were not eligible to receive the ESL award. When the EFL award was introduced, the rules were changed to allow teams who reach the semi-finals (but not the Grand Final) to be able to receive the ESL or EFL award.

=== English as a Foreign Language (EFL) Award Winners ===
Year	EFL Award Winners
2019	Slovenia
2015	Denmark - Denmark Red
2014	Romania - SAVA A
2013	Romania - ARGO
2012	Israel - Lod 1
2011	Czech Republic - Red
2010	Czech Republic - Czech 1

== Participating Countries ==
So far the following nations have taken part in the Heart of Europe International Debating Tournament since its inception in 2001.

- Argentina
- Belarus
- Bosnia and Herzegovina
- Bermuda
- Bulgaria
- Croatia
- Canada
- Chile
- China
- Czech Republic
- Denmark
- England
- Estonia
- Germany
- Hong Kong
- Hungary
- India
- Israel
- Japan
- Latvia
- Lithuania
- North Macedonia
- Moldova
- Montenegro
- Nigeria
- Palestine
- Peru
- Qatar
- Romania
- Russia
- Scotland
- Serbia
- Singapore
- Slovakia
- Slovenia
- South Africa
- South Korea
- Spain
- Sweden
- Turkey
- Thailand
- Ukraine
- United Kingdom
- United States
- Vietnam

== Past Motions ==
P indicates prepared motion I indicates impromptu motion.

=== *2003 ===
GRAND FINAL

THBT a federal Europe will never come about.

PRELIMINARY ROUNDS

1. THBT president Bush's war on terror is making a valid contribution to combatting terrorism.

2. THBT compensation should be paid for injustice committed by previous generations.

3. THBT the United Nations has failed.

4. THW impose economics sanctions to end child labour.

=== *2004 ===
GRAND FINAL

TH welcomes the Euro.

PRELIMINARY ROUNDS

1. THBT true democracy is direct democracy.

2. THW put fat cats on a diet.

3. TH condemns gambling.

4. THBT the state should have no role in broadcasting.

=== *2006 ===
Are not known.

=== *2008 ===
GRAND FINAL

THBT NATO has lost its importance after the Cold War.

PRELIMINARY ROUNDS

1. THBT Extremism in the pursuit of liberty is no vice.

2. THBT China represents a Threat to World Security.

3. THBT Russian Democracy is much sham as was Soviet Socialism.

4. THBT the USA is the greatest threat to the world's future Environment.

=== *2009 ===
GRAND FINAL

THBT subsidizing the car industry will not solve the world economic crisis.

PRELIMINARY ROUNDS

1. THBT BRIC states (Brazil, India, China) are a menace to Europe.

2. THW punish Mugabe.

3. THBT the World Bank is an obstacle to development.

4. THBT genetically modified foods are in the public interest.

=== *2010 ===
GRAND FINAL

THBT Israel should be obliged (if necessary by force) to withdraw from all lands acquired since 1966

PRELIMINARY ROUNDS

1. THBT All Drugs should be legalized.

2. THBT Turkey should be admitted into the European Union.

3. THBT Downloading music and films from the internet should be prohibited.

4. THBT All Foreign forces should be withdrawn from Afghanistan.

=== *2011 ===
GRAND FINAL

THBT Central Banks should set limits on government spending.

PRELIMINARY ROUNDS

1. THBT democracy is not the answer for every country.

2. THBT nuclear energy is a necessary means of fighting the climate change.

3. THW give preference to immigration applicants whose values are consistent with those of the host nation.

4. THBT peer pressure is more beneficial than harmful.

=== *2012 ===
GRAND FINAL

This House believes that attempts to create a supranational Europe are going to fail.

PRELIMINARY ROUNDS

1. TH condemns the payment of bonuses to executives to supplement their salaries.

2. THBT a parliamentary democracy requires the inclusion of sovereign referenda to decide on important issues.

3. THBT Las Malvinas (The Falkland Islands) should be returned to Argentina.

4. THBT all young people should be required to do some form of National Service (not necessarily military) for two full years.

PRELIMINARY ROUNDS - IMPROMPTU SETS

A. Motions on Sport and Health

1. This House believes that we should establish one permanent centre for the Olympic Games to be held each Olympiad.

2. This House believes that the manufacture and sale of tobacco should be made illegal.

3. This House considers that many professional sportsmen are grossly overpaid.

B. Motions on Education

1. This House believes that all Mainstream Secondary Schools should provide Esperanto as their first Foreign Language.

2. This House believes that school History should only be taught from an international perspective.

3. This House believes that Physical Education should only be an optional for students over the age of 18.

C. Motions on Crime and Punishment

1. This House believes that there are some crimes for which Life Imprisonment without the possibility of Parole is an appropriate punishment.

2. This House believes that the right to self-defence should include the right to use firearms against house breakers.

3. This House believes that the wearing of full burqa, hijab jilbab or niqad in public should be outlawed.

D. International Motions

1. This House believes that no Nations in the UN Security Council should have the right of veto.

2. This House believes that there can be no hope of lasting peace in the Middle East until Israel withdraws to its boundaries of 1967.

3. This House believes that China should be exiled from the community of nations until it recognizes the full sovereignty of Tibet.

BREAKING ROUNDS - IMPROMPTU SETS

E. Motions for the Octofinals

1. This House would outlaw all zoos, animal park and circus animals since they represent cruelty to animals.

2. Religion has done more harm than good.

3. This House believes that public transport in urban areas should be provided free by local authorities.

F. Motions for the Quarter Finals

1. The preservation of minority languages and cultures such as Welsh, Breton, Catalan makes European Integration more difficult and therefore should notbe supported by European Funding.

2. This House believes that Private Education should be made illegal.

3. This House believes that a Free Press needs some control.

G. Motions for the Semi Finals

1. This House believes that Immigration into Europe presents a positive hope for the future of Europe.

2. Modern Trends in the Arts (Music, Painting, Literature etc.) have failed to communicate with large numbers of the public.

3. This House believes that the Twentieth Century was a century of progress for humanity.

=== *2013 ===
(1)

THBT the role of the Roman Catholic Church since 1945 in the world diplomacy has been overwhelmingly negative

(2)

THBT with the ending of the Warsaw Pact there is no further justification for the existence of NATO

(3) SPORT

1. THW pardon all sportsmen found guilty of using performance enhancement drugs

2. THW pay professional sportsmen as much as university professors

3. THW Ban Sports that involve killing animals

(4) Culture

1. THBT modern art may be modern but is rarely art

2. THBT the Beetles have contributed more to society than Beethoven

3. THW stop state funding of the arts

(5)

THW stop public funding of space exploration

(6)

THBT war causes more problems than it solves

(7) Education

1. TH Prefers single-sex schools to co-educational schools

2. THW require all new teacher graduates from developed countries to work in the developing world for a period of twelve months.

3. THBT nationalism has no place in the school curriculum

(8)Politics and Economics

1. THS Free Trade to the developing world

2. THBT there is no place for monarchy in a democratic country

3. This house believes that corrupt democracy is better than dictatorship

(OF) Environment

1. THBT there is no future without nuclear energy

2. THW rather use its resources to adapt to climate change than to prevent it

3. THW Mandate recycling Programs in developing countries

(QF) International relations

1. THBT Tibet should be recognized as an independent state

2. THBT America has done more harm than good since 1945

3. THBT the ICC should have the authority to investigate and prosecute any cases

(SF) Religion Morality Ethics

1. THW not use medically scarce resources on terminally ill patients

2. THBT multiculturalism has failed

3. THBT religion should have a place in public education

FINAL

THBT in the long run there is no hope to save Euro without a Federal Europe

=== *2014 ===
This year motions were created by Motion Committee: Wissam Chalabi, Lukas Machacek and Jakub Kadlec. The committee had advisors: Carmen Belafi, Tristan Von Zahn, Eva Nike Cvikl, Itumeleng Kenneth Mohanoe, Frankie Cena, Martin Rezny, Bojana Skrt, Olesia Yakimakha.

(1) P

THBT the NSA should continue using PRISM despite the reaction to its disclosure

(2) P

THW prohibit the privatization of natural resources in developing countries

(3) I FAMILY ISSUES

1. TH Regrets the decision of children who cut all ties with their parents

2. TH Supports assisted suicide for terminally ill minors

3. THW abolish the right to refuse to give evidence in court cases against family members

(4) I SPORTS

1. TH Regrets giving Russia the right to host the 2018 FIFA World Cup

2. THBT sports leagues should not use cheerleading performances at their events

3. THW only allow amateur athletes to compete at the Olympic Games

(5) P

Considering its role in the holocaust, THBT Germany should recognize a Palestinian state and urge Israel to do the same

(6) I EDUCATION

1. THW ban traditional circumcision/initiation schools (with info slip)

2. THW pay performance based salaries to teachers

3. THBT social media does more harm than good to education

(7) I SCIENCE

1. THBT the MarsOne mission should be cancelled (with info slip)

2. THW Stop the search for extraterrestrial intelligent life

3. THW not allow social media sites to conduct psychological experiments on their users without their knowledge

(8) I INTERNATIONAL RELATIONS

1. THBT private military companies should be banned from UN Peacekeeping Operations (with info slip) (not picked)

2. THBT the decision to engage in any form of military intervention (including war) should be made by the political executive in a state and not by the citizens

3. THW not pay ransom to terrorist groups that hold hostages

(OF) I DEVELOPING COUNTRIES

1. THBT violence is a legitimate tool for political opposition movements in authoritarian states

2. THBT western nations should make aid conditional on advances in gay rights

3. THBT developing countries should hold the Catholic Church financially liable for the medical expenses of AIDS victims in areas where the church campaigns against condom use. (not picked)

(QF) I EQUALITY

1. THBT the feminist movement should oppose affirmative action for women in western liberal democracies

2. THBT the state should fully subsidise gender reassignment surgery. (not picked)

3. THBT refugees should be granted voting rights in their recipient countries

(SF) I PROTESTS (all with info slip)

1. TH Opposes the extinguishing of Buddhist monks who self-immolate in Protest

2. TH Regrets the American people’s opposition to military intervention (not picked)

3. THBT hacktivism is a legitimate tool of political protest

FINAL P

THBT refugees should be granted voting rights in their recipient countries

=== *2015 ===
This year motions were created by Motion Committee: Itumeleng Kenneth Mohanoe, Frankie Cena, Mgr. Martin Rezny and Jakub Kadlec.

(1) P

THBT international military intervention against Boko Haram is justified, regardless of the views of the Nigerian government

(2) P

THBT the normalization of relations between the USA and Cuba will result in substantial improvements in civil rights in Cuba

(3) I EDUCATION

1. THW concede to the enjoyment and fulfilment of sex (including sexual gratification) when designing a sex education curriculum

2. THW make sports compulsory for university and college students

3. THW not grade students in public schools

(4) I SPORTS AND ARTS

1. THBT the restriction to use performance-enhancement drugs in sport is unjustified

2. THW not allow owners of culturally important artworks to alter them

3. THW Reveal the work of a dead author, even against his will

(5) P

THBT sexually assertive female pop stars identifying as feminists are harmful for feminism

(6) P

THBT the Eurasian Economic Union is going to be a threat to the European Union in the future

(7) I MINORITY RIGHTS

1. THW consider gender identity when addressing affirmative action

2. THBT the legalization of gay marriage around the world will lead to significant improvements of the LGBTQ Community

3. THBT the enshrining of gay rights in constitutions does more harm than good for the LGBTQ movement

(8) I TRADITIONS, CULTURE AND RELIGION

1. THBT individuals who worship their ancestors should practise that as a faith rather than just “thanksgiving”

2. THW ban polygamy

3. THS individuals who choose to identify from a race they were not born into

(OF) I JUSTICE

1. THW allow individuals to sue religious organisations for making decisions that harm them

2. THW pay reparations to descendants of slaves

3. THW try dangerous youth offenders as adults

(QF) I SOCIAL MEDIA/SOCIAL NETWORKING

1. THBT the reliance of news from social media has damaged the credibility of news-reporting

2. THBT employers should not be influenced by information on social networking sites when hiring and firing

3. THBT the media should be required to cap political advertising by candidates and parties during elections

(SF) I ECONOMICS AND POLITICS

1. THBT a two-party political system is more effective than a multi-party political system

2. In times of economic crises, THW instate a government of expert economists, and not politicians

3. THBT all debts of developing countries owed to developed countries should be forgiven

FINAL P

THBT EU’s development aid should be focused primarily on education

=== *2016 ===
This year prepared motions were created by Motion Committee: Itumeleng Kenneth Mohanoe (ZAR), Frankie Cena (CAN), Laura Krawczyk (POL), Mgr. Martin Rezny (CZE) and Jakub Kadlec (CZE). Impromto sets were created by Motion Committee: Itumeleng Kenneth Mohanoe (ZAR), Frankie Cena (CAN), Dena Tabyanian (CAN), aura Krawczyk (POL), Simona Mazilu (ROM), Delfina Vildósola (ARG), Mgr. Martin Rezny (CZE) and Jakub Kadlec (CZE).

(1) P

THBT constitutions of liberal democracies should not enshrine LGBTQ rights

(2) P

THBT constitutions of liberal democracies should not enshrine LGBTQ rights

(3) I EDUCATION

1. THW require all public servants voted into office (presidents, deputies, ministers, premiers etc.)to send their children to public school

2. THW require public schools to teach the basic tenets of the world's main religions

3. THBT Boarding Schools have done more harm than good

(4) I POLITICS

1. THBT social media is an effective tool in maintaining democracy

2. Assuming there is a pill that forces politicians to tell the truth, TH would force them to take it when running for office

3. THBT poorly informed voters are the greatest risk to liberal democracies

(5) P

THW pay citizens to house refugees (6) P

THW pay citizens to house refugees

(7) I WOMEN/FEMINISM

1. TH, given the technology, would make men bear children

2. THW condemn chivalrous behavior as sexist

3. THBT A Hillary Election is good for feminism

(8) I MORALITY/ETHICS

1. THW allow the government to implant GPS trackers in everyone

2. THBT unconventional forms of political activism are effective tools for change in a democracy

3. THBT Companies should divulge private personal information of customers if required by Government Authorities

(OF) I ECONOMICS

1. THW nationalize any company that is deemed to be too big to fail

2. THBT people who indulge in dangerous lifestyles should pay higher health care

3. THW not tax the poor

(QF) I IDENTITY POLITICS

1. THW compensate every black family in America regardless of whether their ancestors were enslaved

2. THBT nationalism has more good than harm

3. THBT tourism companies should not be allowed to use previously oppressed groups for marketing purposes

(SF) I GENERAL/INTERNATIONAL RELATIONS

1. THBT being an illegal immigrant should not be enough to get someone deported

2. THBT developing countries should prioritize environmental protection over resource extraction

3. THBT the next Secretary-General of the United Nations MUST be a woman

FINAL P

THBT all EU states should remove restrictions from their former colonies

== See also ==
- World Schools Style debate
- Parliamentary style debate
- Eurasian Schools Debating Championships
- World Schools Debating Championships
