= Parliamentary style debate =

Academic debate event format

Parliamentary style debate, oftentimes colloquially referred to as just Parliamentary debate, is a formal framework for debate used in debating societies, academic debate events and competitive debate. It has its roots in parliamentary procedure and develops differently in different countries as a result.

The style was first formalised in 19th century England. Procedural commentaries by members of parliament like John Hooker or William Hakewill or parliamentary clerks such as Henry Elsynge sr. and Henry Scobell recorded not just the rulebook but the manner of parliamentary debate. This manner was then expanded upon in the later commentaries of John Hatsell, Jeremy Bentham and Thomas Erskine May, which then spread the style of parliamentary debate throughout Europe and the world.

Today, many organisations at the secondary and tertiary levels of education, such as schools, colleges or debate-clubs sponsor parliamentary debate teams. In the 1980s, global debating championships such as the World Universities Debating Championship and related formats were established, which all use variants of the parliamentary style of debate.

== British Parliamentary debate ==
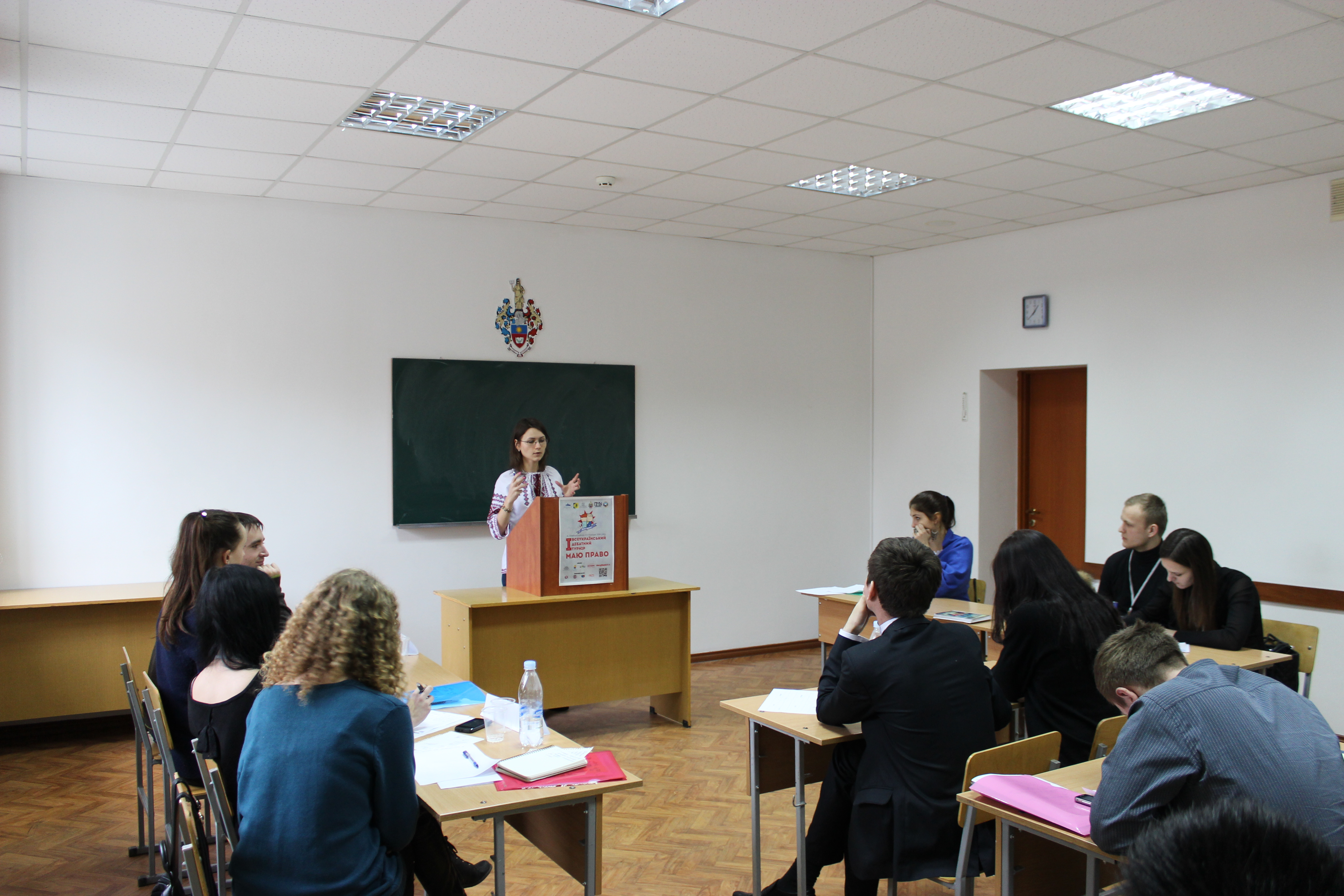
Debating in Khmelnytskyi, Ukraine. The Deputy Leader of the Opposition is speaking.

British Parliamentary debate is very widespread. It has also been adopted as the official style of the World Universities Debating Championship and the European Universities Debating Championship (at which the speakers are given only fifteen minutes' notice of the motion). Speeches are usually between five and seven minutes in duration. The debate consists of four teams of two speakers, sometimes called factions, with two teams on either side of the case.

Because of the style's origins in British parliamentary procedure, the two sides are called the Government and the Opposition, while the speakers take their titles from those of their parliamentary equivalents (such as the opening Government speaker, called the Prime Minister). Furthermore, since this style is based on parliamentary debate, each faction is considered to be one of two parties in a coalition. They must therefore differentiate themselves from the other team on their side of the case in order to succeed in their own right.

All speakers are expected to offer Points of Information (POIs) to their opponents. POIs are particularly important in British Parliamentary style, as it allows the first two teams to maintain their relevance during the course of the debate, and the last two teams to introduce their arguments early in the debate. The first and last minute of each speech is considered "protected time", during which no POI may be offered.

Depending on the country, there are variations in speaking time, speaking order, and the number of speakers. For example, in New Zealand, both the leader of the Opposition and the Prime Minister offer a short summary as the last two speakers.

== Parliamentary Style in the United States ==
American parliamentary debate is supported by a number of organizations in the United States at the tertiary and secondary levels.

=== University level ===
The most popular intercollegiate parliamentary debate style is supported by the National Parliamentary Debate Association (NPDA), which was born in western US in 1991. NPDA circuit consists of a loose confederation of local leagues and a number of invitational tournaments. The NPDA season culminates with two national tournaments – NPDA Nationals and the National Parliamentary Tournament of Excellence (NPTE). NPDA Nationals (founded in 1994) is open to all and attracts about 200 teams each year. NPTE (founded in 2001) is qualification-only and invites the top 64 teams of the approximately 1000 teams that compete in NPDA/NPTE-sanctioned invitationals throughout the season. Phi Rho Pi Nationals for junior and community colleges have an NPDA-style division, as do Novice Nationals. The chief online forum for the NPDA circuit is Net-Benefits.net, started in 2002 by Jed Link.

American Parliamentary Debate Association (APDA), the oldest intercollegiate parliamentary debate league in the US, was founded in 1982. APDA currently has around 40 member universities, primarily on the east coast.

A number of smaller intercollegiate debate leagues, such as the Lincoln Parliamentary League (LPL) and International Public Debate Association (IPDA) also exist.

The British Parliamentary Style (a.k.a. Worlds Debate, distinct from World Schools Style) is also beginning to spread to the US, with the US Universities Debating Championship held annually at rotating universities.

Chamber Debate is a modified form of Australia-Asia debating that sponsors three national tournaments annually using the 3-on-3 format of parliamentary debate Unlike other formats of parliamentary debate, Chamber Debate allows teams to use electronic devices via a 4th non-speaking member of each team who conducts fact-checking and other research for their team during the round.

=== Current ===
Parliamentary debate is offered various local High School Leagues and the National Parliamentary Debate League (NPDL).

The other public school high school debate league, National Forensic League (NFL), does not offer parliamentary debate at its national tournament. It does, however, recognize parli competitions offered at the state level, albeit at a reduced points value. In 2010 NFL Nationals added Supplemental Debate, which bears some similarity to parliamentary debate.

A number of attempts to organize a high school parli championship tournament have been made – National Parliamentary Caucus (2003–2005), NPDL Parli Grand Nationals (2006–2007) and IDEA Tournament of Champions (2005–2009, switched to world format in 2010).

The current incarnation of such a championship is the Tournament of Champions, hosted by the NPDL. It was started as a California championship, named "California Cup," but has been renamed the Tournament of Champions to represent the prestige of the high school tournament. The "NPDL Nationals," an annual online tournament held at the end of the year, is also hosted by NPDL. However, the rules for qualification differ between the two tournaments. Although Nationals is open to all, TOC is limited to teams that exceed a certain yearly points threshold.

Oregon State Tournament (OSAA) added parliamentary debate (known in Oregon as Public debate) in 2001, California State Tournament (CHSSA) followed suit in 2003, and Pennsylvania State Tournament (PHSSL) in 2010. Yale, ASU, Whitman, as well as a number of invitational tournaments in Oregon and California, the largest of them held at Stanford, James Logan HS, SCU, UOP, Willamette, University of Oregon, Pepperdine and Claremont HS also offer parli. The Kansas City, Missouri area has conducted monthly high school tournaments since 2002. The Kansas City Greater Metropolitan Parliamentary Debate League offers two-round contests during the week with a championship tournament at the end of the school year.

High school parli is taught at several summer debate camps, including Stanford National Forensics Institute, ODI, CCPDI, and the POI Debate Institute at UC Berkeley.

On the home school level, the home school debate league, Stoa, also promotes parliamentary debate in a number of its tournaments nationwide. Stoa also offers parliamentary debate at nationals. The other home school debate league, NCFCA, does not offer parliamentary debate at any of its tournaments or is it hosted at nationals.

=== Format ===
The first key feature uniting various formats of parliamentary debate in the US is their spontaneity. The resolutions alternate each round. They are announced, then participants are given 20 minutes of preparation time known as "prep". APDA is somewhat of an exception in the respect, with "loose link" rounds allowing the affirmative to run a case of their choosing, dealing with virtually any topic. The second key feature of parli is a ban on quoted evidence. Debaters may not bring in any material that was not prepared in the 20 minutes of preparation time and consult it during the round. APDA, Worlds and high school parli debate styles tend to take a more lay-friendly approach to debate, ensuring that debates are easy to understand no matter the audience member's expertise of the resolution. NPDA is more diverse, with some teams engaging in a more academic and specific-knowledge style borrowed from Policy debate. Resolutions typically focus on current events, though the entrance of the Kritik to NPDA, and, to a lesser extent, to some high school circuits, introduced a philosophical element to parli.

This style consists of a two-on-two debate, between the affirmative team, known as the Government or the Proposition, and the negative team, referred to as the Opposition. Debater role names are borrowed from the British Parliament, with the judge being referred to as the Speaker. The round consists of six speeches, as follows:

1. Prime Minister (PM): the first affirmative speaker presents the affirmative case
2. Leader of the Opposition Constructive (LOC): the first negative speaker presents the negative case and answers the PMC arguments
3. Member of the Government Constructive (MGC): the second affirmative speaker upholds the affirmative case by pulling across information that was not addressed in the LOC and responds to the LOC arguments
4. Member of the Opposition Constructive (MOC): the second negative speaker upholds the negative case by pulling across information that was not addressed in the MGC and responds to the MGC arguments
5. Leader of the Opposition Rebuttal (LOR): the first negative speaker begins with an overview of why the negative team should win and explicitly analyzes certain arguments that had been dropped by the affirmative team throughout the debate. New arguments are not allowed.
6. Prime Minister Rebuttal (PMR):the first affirmative speaker summarizes the round with an overview and responds to any new arguments brought up in the MOC/LOC Opp block and provides reasons for why the judge should vote affirmative. New arguments in the PMR are not allowed.

Specific rules and speech times vary slightly between organizations. NPDA, APDA and OSAA use the 7-8-8-8-4-5 format, CHSSA and the ASU Invitational use the Claremont 7-7-7-7-5-5 format, the SCU Invitational uses the 6-7-7-7-4-5 format, and Yale high school tournaments use the Osterweis 4-5-5-5-2-3 format. PHSSL borrows its 8 speeches 6-6-6-6-6-6-3-3 format from World Schools Style debate.

Most variations of the style do not include a specialized cross-examination period, but allow debaters to make parliamentary points.

- Points of Information (POI) are questions or statements the opposing side can direct the speaker who has the floor. The speaker has an option to recognize or decline a POI. In most styles POIs cannot be made during the first and last minute of each speech (known as protected time) or during rebuttals.
- Points of Order are made when the speaker is introducing a new argument during a rebuttal speech, or grossly mischaracterizing arguments. During a Point of Order, official time (usually kept by the judge) is to be stopped while the judge listens and considers the point raised.
- Points of Clarification (POC) are questions asked to the speaker when giving a PMC or an LOC. The question aims to clarify the speaker's advocacy or interpretation of the resolution. Similar to Points of Order, Points of Clarification cannot be declined, and time is stopped while the discussion is taking place. POCs are more common at the high school level, most often at NPDL tournaments.
- Points of Personal Privilege (PPP) are made when the speaker makes offensive claims or personal attacks.

== Brazilian Parliamentary Style ==
The Brazilian Parliamentary Debate involves a "proposition team", that will support the motion, and an "opposition team", who will oppose the motion. Unlike the British Parliamentary debate, the Brazilian debate uses the term "proposition", instead of "government", since [Brazil] has a congressional government rather than a [parliament]. Thus, teams can either support or oppose the topic in session on the Congress. Therefore, the speakers at the debate are called "First Member of Proposition", "First Member of Opposition", "Second Member of Proposition", and so on.

It is the most used competitive debating style used in Brazil; it is used at the official competitions of the Instituto Brasileiro de Debates (Brazilian Institute of Debates). At Parli Brasil, every speaker speaks for 7 minutes, with 15 seconds of tolerance after that. After the first minute and before the last minute, debaters from the opposite team may ask for Points of Information, which the speaker may accept or reject as they wish (although they are supposed to accept at least one). Another major difference between the Brazilian scene and the Worlds is that Brazilian tournaments use to present themes weeks before the tournament, with the motion only being presented 15 minutes before the debate, as usual BP. Some tournaments, such as GV Debate and Open de Natal are changing this, too. The presence of themes makes some differences in the strategy in comparison to the general parliamentary debate.

However, there is no unique model in Brazil because many club debates were created before the creation of "Parli Brazil" and not all modified their rules. This is the case, for example, of the UFC Debate Society in Fortaleza ("Sociedade de Debates da UFC"), which was established in 2010. In 2013, UFRN Debate Society was created and implemented some changes based on the old "Clube de Debates de Natal". The model "Parli Brazil" only started its activities in 2014 with the realization of the I Brazilian Championship of Debates in the city of Belo Horizonte, making the second edition in the city of Fortaleza, and the third is scheduled to take place in the city of Florianópolis. Since then, they were also created UFSC Debate Society ("Sociedade de Debates da UFSC") in 2014 and the UFRJ Debate Society ("Sociedade de Debates da UFRJ") on June 25, 2015, and others.

== Parliamentary Open-Debating [OPD] (German) ==
The offene parlamentarische Debatte (Open Parliamentary Debate, OPD) is a German competitive debating format. It was developed by the debate club Streitkultur Tübingen and was used for the first time in a tournament in 2001. It aims to combine the advantages of parliamentary debates and public audience debates: each of the two teams has three speakers, and in addition, the debate includes three independent "free speakers". Clubs using OPD exist in Germany, Austria, Switzerland, and Italy.

== World Schools style ==
World Schools Style Debating combines the British Parliamentary and Australian formats, which results in a debate comprising eight speeches delivered by two three-member teams (the Proposition and the Opposition). Each speaker delivers an eight-minute speech – the first two are substantive matter and the third a rebuttal speech; then both teams deliver a "reply speech" lasting four minutes, with the last word being reserved for the Proposition. In junior debates, these limits are changed to about 5 minutes, and in some local competitions, speeches are 7 minutes.

Between the end of the first and the beginning of the last minute of an eight-minute speech, the opposing party may offer "points of information". Depending on the tournament rules, the speaker may refuse these, or may be mandated to take one (mandatory POI rule), but it is encouraged to take at least one or two points during his or her speech. No points of order or Privilege are used.

Topics can be supplied long in advance, or may be given 45 minutes or an hour before the debate begins. There is not much room for re-definition, and squirreling is strictly prohibited. The World Schools Debating Championships is attended by many countries, and uses this format.

A similar format, with 7-minute speeches and Points-of-Information, is known as the Asian Parliamentary Format and is used by the United Asian Debating Championships

== See also ==
- Public debate
- International university debating
  - World Universities Debating Championship
  - American Parliamentary Debate Association
  - Canadian University Society for Intercollegiate Debate
  - North American Debating Championship
  - North American Public Speaking Championship
  - National Parliamentary Debate Association
  - National Parliamentary Tournament of Excellence
- International high school debating
  - World Schools Debating Championships
  - Heart of Europe Debating Tournament
  - World Individual Debating and Public Speaking Championship
  - Debate#Australia-Asia debate Debate
