= Point of information =

Point of information may refer to:

- Point of information (competitive debate)
- Point of information in parliamentary procedure -- now known as Request for information (parliamentary procedure)
