= WSDC =

WSDC may refer to:

- World Schools Debating Championships, a high-profile annual English-language debating tournament for high school-level teams representing different countries
- WSDC (FM), a radio station (88.5 FM) licensed to Sneedville, Tennessee, United States
- WSDC (1560 AM), a defunct radio station licensed to Mocksville, North Carolina that existed during the 1960s.
