= Impromptu debate =

Form of academic debate

Impromptu debate is a type of formalized academic debate. Representative of comedic debate, Impromptu debate is practised at high schools and universities, generally in tandem with other, more serious forms of debate. In some areas, such as portions of Canada, impromptu debate is treated as formally as parliamentary debate.

== Content ==
Impromptu is an individual event that consists of just one competitor giving a speech against other competitors that give their speech at a separate time. Impromptu differs from other forms of debate because an emphasis on humour is usually given, as well as on logic and performance. The resolutions debated often encourage humorous debates. Further, this form of debate is focused on a specific topic or a quotation. The competitor has a very short window of time usually not more than a few minutes to come up with a speech that generally lasts for a few minutes. This speech is based on how the speaker interprets the message and whether or not the speaker agrees with the quotation. Many colleges and universities compete in this and other forms of speech throughout the US.

== Format ==
Each team comprises two members, each of whom is named according to their team and speaking position within his or her team. The Impromptu format varies, depending on what "traditional" debate format on what it is based. For example, an impromptu debate in Policy Style style, for example, might follow the Policy speech format but with radically altered content or speech lengths.

The format is conducted in a different way than typical debates. The rules are bent to provide the students with minimal to zero experience in debating to participate in the debate.

Junior State of America Impromptu debate format usually consists of choosing two volunteers out of the students attending the block and then having the audience assign a topic to them.

== Judging ==
There are several methods of judging an Impromptu debate. The most standard method is when a single judge observes the debate and simply votes one way or another; however, it is sometimes acceptable to have the audience (if it is sufficiently large) cast votes, with the winner determined by majority.

There are other ways to judge these types of debates. One way is to have a minimum of three judges that all come from different backgrounds - providing diversity and different views. It is not necessary, although encouraged for the judges to have some sort of experience in the topic being debated in addition to experience in debating.

== Purpose ==
Most impromptu debates focus on making up an argument on the spot, as impromptu debating usually has a randomized topic. Impromptu debating has the debaters make up the words as they speak, in order to help improve their debating and fast thinking skills. Impromptu debating also helps better someone's ability to persuade an audience.
