= World Debating Championship =

World Debating Championship may refer to:

- World Universities Debating Championship
- World Schools Debating Championships
