= ESDC =

ESDC may refer to:

- Empire State Development Corporation
- Employment and Social Development Canada
- Eurasian Schools Debating Championship
- European Security and Defence College
