= Public debate =

Form of public dialogue

Public debate may mean simply debating by the public, or in public. The term is also used for a particular formal style of debate in a competitive or educational context. Two teams of two compete through six rounds of argument, giving persuasive speeches on a particular topic.

== Pre-Debate ==
Before the round takes place, the teams are designated as either the Affirmative or the Negative. The two teams are then given three topics from which to choose. The Affirmative is given first strike which means that they remove one of the topics from the list. The Negative then is left with two topics to choose from, and will choose which topic they wish to argue by again using their strike and removing the topic they do not wish to talk on. The two teams will then have fifteen minutes to formulate the case they wish to present. At the end of the 15 minutes the teams reconvene and begin the debate.

The members of each team are referred to as the following:

- Leader of the Affirmative
- Member of the Affirmative
- Leader of the Negation
- Member of the Negation

== Timetable ==
Prep-Period: 15 minutes

Leader Affirmative: 7 minutes

Leader Negation: 8 minutes

Member Affirmative: 8 minutes

Member Negation: 8 minutes

Leader Negation Rebuttal: 4 minutes

Leader Affirmative Rebuttal: 5 minutes

As with any debating style, the individual timings may vary between tournaments.

== Procedural information ==
At the beginning of each speech the speaker is expected to thank their partner, the opposition, the judge and anybody who is watching. While not explicitly important it is a formal nicety that is expected of each debater. To ask a question a member of the opposing team stands up and waits for the speaker to take their question. Questioning may occur at any time during the debate with a few exceptions.

- If it is a rebuttal.
- If it is within the first minute of the speech.
- If it is after the last minute of the speech.
- If the speaker places any restrictions on the questioning or refuses to answer a question.

Note that if a speaker refuses to take a question, it can reflect badly on the speaker. Also, a speaker must not ever directly insult or attack their opponents, only the points they are making. Similarly, when a speech is being given side talking is not allowed as it can distract the speaker. The only way that someone may show approval of a topic is to knock on the desk. During a rebuttal speech the speaker is not allowed to bring up any new points of information or talk about anything that has not already been covered.

== Leader of the Affirmative ==
The leader of the Affirmative is responsible for several key points in the debate. As the first speaker they must define the resolution that they selected earlier. For instance, if the resolution is Resolved: this house would abandon the use of torture on enemy combatants, the Leader of the Affirmative would be responsible for defining the meaning of this house, enemy combatants and any other key pieces of the resolution. Whatever they fail to define the Leader of the Opposition is then free to define, which can spell disaster for the Affirmative. The Leader of the Affirmative is also responsible for presenting the plan. the plan is the way that the Affirmative will carry out the resolution. Working off the example resolution above, the plan would be something like, "Congress will pass a law expressly stating that any and all forms of inhumane treatment towards peoples in times of war or peace would be expressly forbidden at any level of command". If the Affirmative fails to present a plan the negation can claim that they win automatically because the Affirmative did not give them a concrete procedure to argue against and effectively Ruined the educational value of the debate. After this the Affirmative uses the remainder of the time to outline his case.

== Leader of the Negation, Member of the Affirmative, and Member of the Negation ==
The three middle speeches all must accomplish two important things in their speeches. The first is the refutation of their opponents case and the second is the building of their own case. If a team fails to refute a point given by their opponents or refute a claim on their own case given by their opponents, it is considered a dropped contention and can result in the loss of the debate.

== Rebuttals ==
Rebuttals are the shortest speeches given in the debate, but are normally the place where debates are won or lost. Each speaker is expected to sum up the important issues of the debate into what are called voters. Each voter is a point of information that a team feels best explains why they have won the debate. During a Rebuttal the speaker is not allowed to bring up new points of information and if they do so it will not be included in the judges decision.

== Flow ==
Debaters utilize a specialized form of note taking, called flowing, to keep track of the arguments presented during a debate. Conventionally, debater's notes are divided into separate flows for each different argument in the debate round. There are multiple methods of flowing but the most common style incorporates columns of arguments made in a given speech which allows the debater to match the next speaker's responses with the original arguments. Certain shorthands for commonly used words are used to keep with the rapid rate of delivery. For example, the abbreviation 'HR' may be used to denote 'Human Rights. The abbreviations or stand-in symbols can and do vary among debaters.

== Terms ==
- Value debate: A value debate is one that is about a specific value, such as individual rights or Justice. In a value debate the teams are expected to argue the importance of concepts and not extensively a policy.
- Paradigms: The specific likes and dislikes of a Judge.
- Solvency: The extent to which a particular resolution or plan will effect change. If a plan lacks solvency it means that it will not have any kind of positive impact if implemented.
- Peanut Gallery: the audience (while a cute way to get a short laugh in the round, this term is overused and has discultured connotations that one may be well advised to avoid).
- Voters: Important and central ideas that a Judge should vote on.
- Plan: The method that will be employed to carry out a resolution.
- Counterplan: A plan sometimes presented by the Opposition to counter the Affirmative plan.
- Ruining the educational value of a debate: Means that the Affirmative has placed too many restrictions on the topic in a direct attempt to make it difficult for the Opposition to argue against.
- Flow: Written notes of the debate to keep track of the points that have been made.

== See also ==
- Leaders' debate
- Parliamentary style debate
- Debate
- Public speaking
