= Hobby School =

School in Khan Uul, Ulaanbaatar, Mongolia

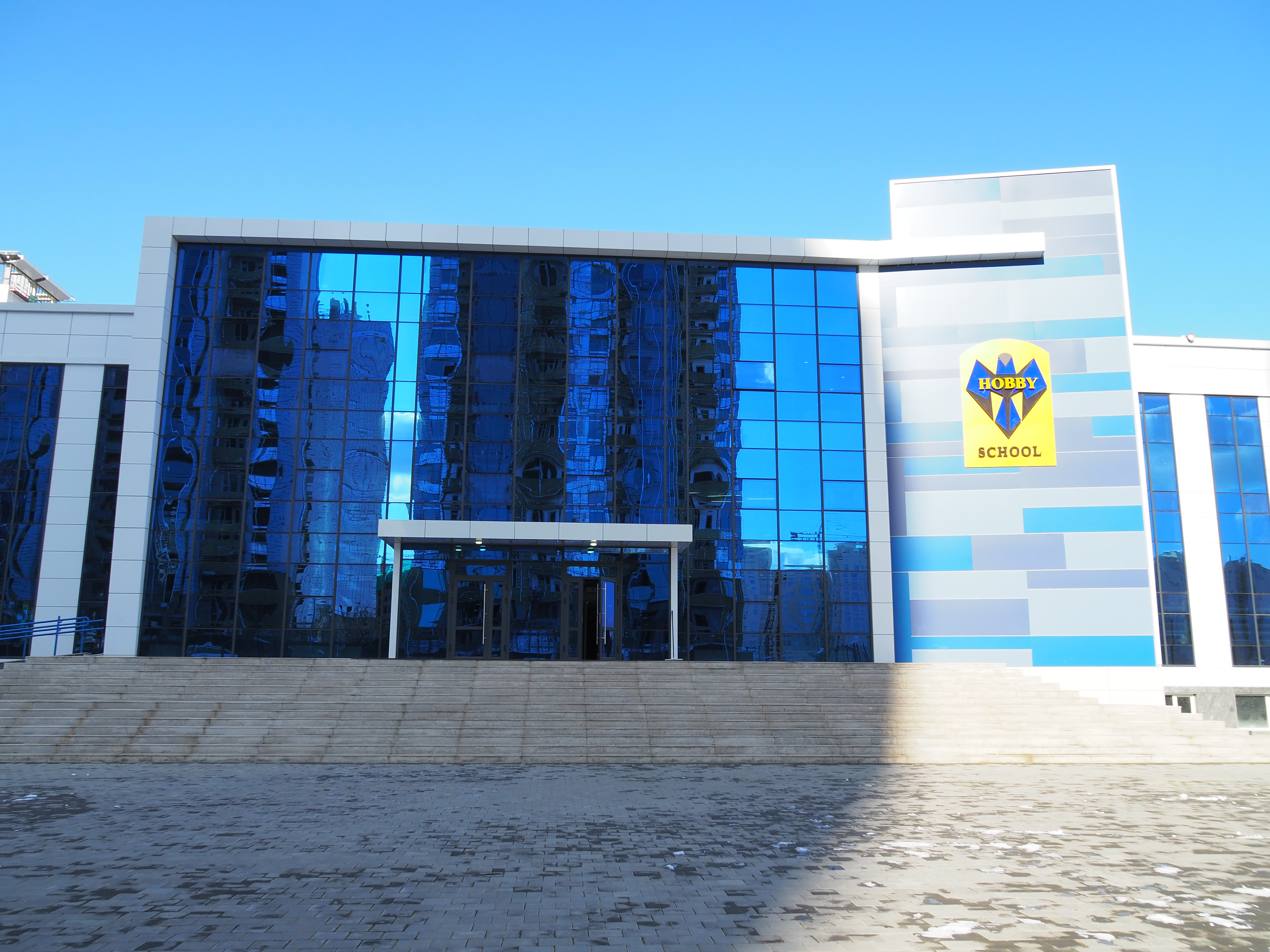
new building

Hobby School of Ulaanbaatar (Mongolian: Хобби Сургууль) is a K-12 private school in Khan Uul District, Ulaanbaatar, Mongolia. It was founded in 1994. Hobby School is one of a few bilingual schools in Ulaanbaatar with complete English language immersion. More than 80% of its graduates are enrolled in higher educational institutions with full and/or partial scholarships all over the world. The school's debate club is the only of its kind in Mongolia. The school is named after the Eurasian Hobby falcon.

== History ==
Hobby School was founded in 1994. Oyuntsetseg Durvuljin was the principal since its foundation. The school principal since 2015 is Tselmuun Gal. In the 2010–11 academic year, the school became the first school in Mongolia to offer AP classes and administer AP examinations. Hobby School is accredited by the Capital City Education Department of Mongolia and follows the State-approved General Secondary Education Curriculum of Mongolia. All students are issued an official Mongolian State Complete Secondary Education Certificate (“Gerchilgee”) upon graduation. In addition to the Mongolian national curriculum and AP, the school also implements The International Primary Curriculum and The International Middle Years Curriculum since 2016.

== Humanitarian activities ==
Hobby High School students participate in and organize various humanitarian activities. Every year, students from 9th, 10th and 11th grades organize a clean-up of the Selbe river in Ulaanbaatar on Earth Day. The school has a history of assisting the 25th special school of Sukhbaatar District in Ulaanbaatar. Following significant contributions have been made:

- In 2000, donation of textbooks.
- In 2002, provided financial aid to 5 students from disadvantaged backgrounds.
- In 2007, scholarship to 5 graduates.
- In 2008, donation of a fully equipped computer lab.

== Debate ==
Hobby School students participated in The World Schools Debating Championships held in Zagreb, Croatia in July 2018. The tournament had participant teams from 64 countries. The Mongolian national team gained victories over the national teams of Rwanda, Turkey, Hungary, and Japan.

In 2020, a team of Hobby students were named co-champions of the international Public Policy Forum - a major international oral and written debate competition on public policy organized by NYU and the Brewer Foundation.
