= National Parliamentary Debate Association =

US student debating association

The National Parliamentary Debate Association (NPDA) is one of the two national intercollegiate parliamentary debate organizations in the United States. The other is the American Parliamentary Debate Association. Its membership is national with participating schools throughout the country. In 2015, NPDA was the largest debating organization in the United States with around 200-250 participating schools in any given year.

== Rules ==
In tournaments sponsored or sanctioned by the NPDA, teams of two debate head-to-head. Tournaments issue a new topic each round, generally on issues such as politics, philosophy and current affairs. After the announcement of the topic, the two teams have 15 minutes to prepare plus the time it takes to walk to the furthest away round in which debates will be taking place (usually rounded to 20 minutes), during which to write out their respective cases.

The standard time limits for an NPDA debate are:

- Preparation period: 20 minutes
- First proposition speaker: 7 minutes
- First opposition speaker: 8 minutes
- Second proposition speaker: 8 minutes
- Second opposition speaker: 8 minutes
- Opposition rebuttal: 4 minutes
- Proposition rebuttal: 5 minutes

There are tournaments, however, at which these are modified, generally to a 7-7-7-7-5-5 format. The Claremont Colleges tournament, for instance, uses this 7-5 format. During constructive speeches, debaters may introduce new arguments and the speaker's opponents may rise to ask questions of the speaker. Constructive speakers can accept or reject any given question. Rebuttals are exclusively for summarizing the arguments that were made during constructives.

Over the past few years, many coaches and competitors have referred to the official title of speeches with different names. These are unofficial yet very popular with many judges:

- Prime Minister Constructive
- Leader of Opposition Constructive
- Member of Government Constructive
- Member of Opposition Constructive
- Leader of Opposition Rebuttal
- Prime Minister Rebuttal

Debaters may not bring in printed, published evidence and consult it during the round. It is expected that debaters will use their own pre-existing knowledge and research conducted prior to the start of the actual round to back their arguments with reasoning and empirical data. This places parliamentary debate in stark contrast to the other common intercollegiate debate format, policy debate, where debaters may utilize quoted evidence.

== Championship Tournament ==
The NPDA runs one debate tournament each year: the NPDA Championship Tournament, held in late March or early April at rotating host sites. While the inaugural tournament in 1994 only hosted around 40 teams, the 2004 Championship Tournament had over 300 in the field from over a half-dozen nations. The tournament's practices are generally modeled by smaller invitational tournaments, which provide the bulk of year-long competition. NPDA sanctions many of these tournaments, and the school that does the best at sanctioned invitationals over the course of the year is awarded a year-long sweepstakes championship.

== Relationship to other tournaments and organizations ==
There are usually several NPDA-sanctioned invitational tournaments in the US to choose from on almost every weekend of the academic year. The largest of these tournaments include the Mile High Swing held in January co-hosted in recent years by Texas Tech University and the University of Utah in Salt Lake City, Utah, the season-opening Bowman Debates at William Jewell College in September, the Steve Hunt Classic held at Lewis & Clark College in October and the Paul Winters Invitational at the University of the Pacific in November.

== Communicating between tournaments ==
Almost from its inception, the NPDA community has taken advantage of the Internet to continue debates (and to debate about debates) between tournaments and in the off season. For years, this took place via the official electronic mailing list, much to the chagrin of those who saw that resource as best used for official communication such as posting tournament invitations and results.

Today, much of the online debate (especially between competitors) in the NPDA community takes place via the online forum Net-Benefits.net, founded by University of Southern California then-undergraduate Jed Link. The name Net-Benefits is a pun, referring to the debate paradigm by which the debate judge weighs the net benefits of two competing policies. The site is now an electronic hub for discourse and information on parliamentary debate.

== National champions ==
Every year since 1994, the organization has held a national championship tournament. Winning teams include:

Year	Team	School
2026	Adrian Lossada & Jasper Pacheco	St Mary’s College
2025	Alexa Grechshkin & Isabel Mathy	Whitman College
2024	Tristan Keene & Brenna Seiersen	Parliamentary Debate at Berkeley
2023	Tristan Keene & Brenna Seiersen	Parliamentary Debate at Berkeley
2022	Jacob Tate & Maximus Renteria	Rice University
2021	Amanda Miskell & Ryan Rashid	Parliamentary Debate at Berkeley
2020	Mitch Deleel & Adeja Powell	McKendree University
2019	Co-champions: Jessica Jung^{1} & lila lavender^{2}/Tom Kadie^{1} & Henry Tolchard^{1}	Parliamentary Debate at Berkeley^{1}/Western Washington University^{2}
2018	Kyle Bligen & Jazmine Buckley	Mercer University
2017	Co-champions: Ryan Kelly & Kaitlyn Bull/Will Starks & Quintin Brown	Washburn University
2016	David Hansen & Katelyn Johnson	William Jewell College
2015	Matt Casas & Anthony Joseph	Kansas City Kansas Community College
2014	Joshua Rivera & Benjamin Campbell	Southern Illinois University Carbondale
2013	Josh Rivera & Mike Selck	Southern Illinois University Carbondale
2012	Lauren Knoth & Josh Ramsey	Washburn University
2011	Hank Fields & Matt Gander	University of Oregon
2010	Brian Horton & Adam Testerman	Texas Tech University
2009	Max Alderman & David Pena	University of Nevada, Reno
2008	Kristen Owen & Anthony Putnicki	Texas Tech University
2007	Tim Kamermayer & Griffith Vertican	Point Loma Nazarene University
2006	Josh Anderson & Rachel Safran	University of Puget Sound
2005	Meredith Price & Paul Bingham	Lewis & Clark College
2004	Ian Samuel & Marie Tenny	Truman State University
2003	Michael Owens & Joshua Wilkerson	University of Wyoming
2002	Ben Garcia & Chris Richter	University of Alaska Anchorage
2001	Danny Barak & Will Trachman	University of California, Berkeley
2000	Ryan Kennedy & Jacob Stutzman	Truman State University
1999	Geof Brodak & Bill Herman	Colorado State University
1998	Heath Curtis & Rebekah Gilbert	Concordia University, Seward
1997	Dan Nelson & Marcus Paroske	Regis University
1996	Ryan Levy & Scott Ruthfield	Rice University
1995	Meredith Marine & Neal Sample	University of Wyoming
1994	Marcus Paroske & Tammy Schultz	Regis University

== Top speakers ==
Year	Speaker	School
2026	Zachary Stansbery	University of Texas at Tyler
2025	Rija Naqvi	Rice University
2024	Jas Liu	Whitman College
2023	Brenna Seiersen	Parliamentary Debate at Berkeley
2022	Arshita Sandhiparthi	University of the Pacific
2021	Cam Wade	Mercer University
2020	Raine McDonagh	Lewis & Clark College
2019	Fiker Tesfaye	Texas Tech University
2018	Logan Kelley	Texas Tech University
2017	Grace Miller	University of Nevada, Reno
2016	Ashe Tippins	Western Washington University
2015	Jazmine Buckley	Mercer University
2014	Marten King	Whitman College
2013	Miranda Morton	Whitman College
2012	Ben Reid	McKendree University
2011	Max Alderman	University of Nevada, Reno
2010	Will Van Treuren	University of Colorado, Boulder
2009	MaryAnn Almeida	Willamette University
2008	Kevin Calderwood	Southern Illinois University Carbondale
2007	Ryan Lawrence	University of California, Berkeley
2006	Joelle Perry	Western Kentucky University
2005	Marie Tenny	University of South Carolina
2004	Ian Samuel	Truman State University
2003	Kyle DeBeer	Colorado College
2002	Audrey Mink	California State University, Long Beach
2001	Katie Angliss	Point Loma Nazarene University
2000	Andrew Vogt	Colorado College
1999	Bill Herman	Colorado State University
1998	Daniel Nelson	Regis University
1997	Marcus Paroske	Regis University
1996	Ryan Levy	Rice University
1995	Nick Coburn-Palo	Weber State University
1994	Andrea Roth	University of New Mexico

== Commonly used books ==
- The Parli Prepbook compiled by Kyle Dennis and written by several coaches and renowned competitors, a community-driven guide to modern parliamentary debate
- Strategic Argumentation in Parliamentary Debate by Eric Robertson, good for beginners and intermediate
- Art, Argument, and Advocacy: Mastering Parliamentary Debate by John Meany and Kate Shuster, best for intermediate and advanced
- On That Point: Introduction to Parliamentary Debate by John Meany, good for beginners
- Burden of Proof: An Introductory Guide to Argumentation and Guide to Parliamentary Debate by Mark Crossman, good for beginners
- Competitive Debate: The Official Guide by Richard E Edwards, good for high schools and not just parliamentary debate

== See also ==
- Competitive debate in the United States
