= Squirrel (debate) =

Type of argument in competitive debate

A squirrel is a term in debating jargon, particularly in parliamentary debate, that indicates a definition from the side of the opening speaker that makes it too easy for his or her side. The first speaker in a debate, who is defending the motion or proposition, generally has to define the terms used in the motion. When this definition is done in an unexpected way, it can favour the opening side, because that side had been able to prepare for the particular interpretation in the preparation time. For example, if the motion read "This House Would dissolve the police", it would be a squirrel to refer to the band The Police instead of the police. Another squirrel in this case, that helps the opening side by making the debate generally easier for them, is to add unreasonable exceptions to the motion. For example, defending "dissolving the police" except in cases where it has to "uphold the law" is rather easy.

In competitive debating, judges usually consider a squirrel a negative thing. There is, however, no clear standard on what constitutes a squirrel, and the judges have to decide this on their own. Sometimes the other side in the debate tries to notify the judges of the squirrel. A notable example is the so-called "open motion" debate, where debaters are expected to come up with their own far-fetched interpretation of an ambiguous motion.

A squirrel can also refer to an affirmative so obscure that there is no known negative against it. These cases are rare and will typically win the round for the affirmative team.

== See also ==
- Moving the goalposts
- Steelmanning and Straw man
