= Eurasian Schools Debating Championship =

High school debate tournament

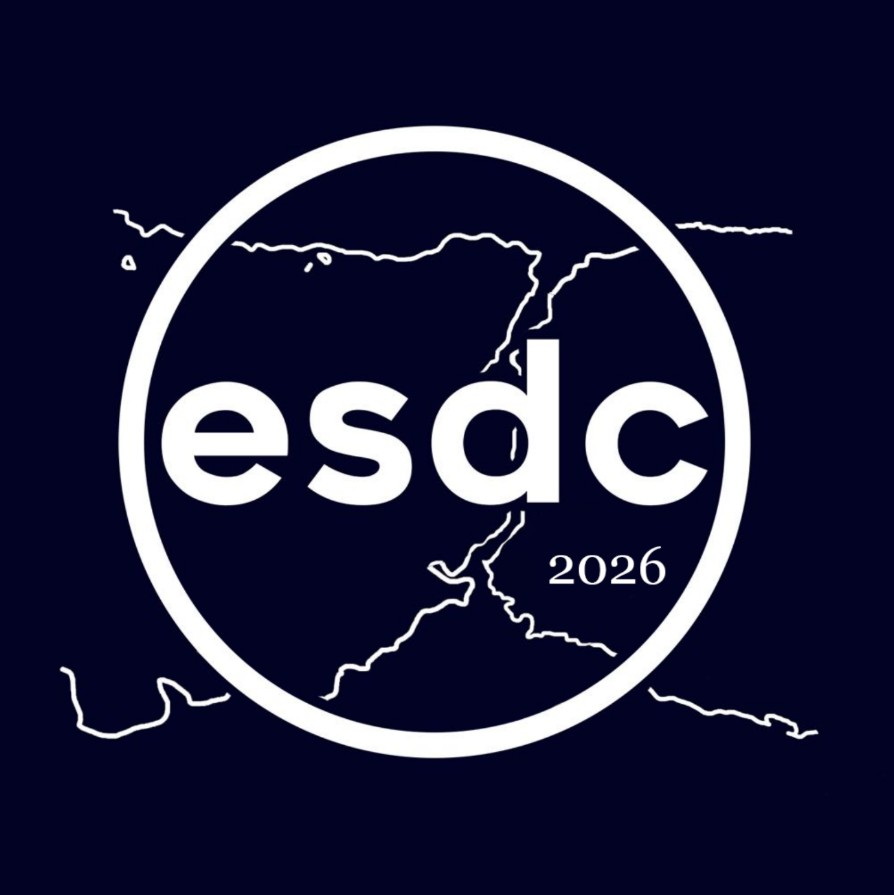

General Information
- Established: 2011 by Robert College Debate Society
- Website: esdc.info
- Location: Istanbul, Turkey
- Venue: Robert College
- Organizer: Robert College Debate Society
- Style: World Schools Style Debating (WSDC)

Social Media
- Instagram: eurasianschoolsdebate
- Facebook: Eurasian Schools Debating Championship 2025

The Eurasian Schools Debating Championship (ESDC) is an annual open English-language debating tournament for high school-level teams representing different countries that takes place in Robert College, Istanbul. ESDC is open to international and school teams alike, depending on team cap. ESDC is organized by members of Robert College Debate Society. ESDC is the world's first and only international WSDC debating championship that is organized completely by high-school students.

The first edition was hosted by the Robert College Debate Society in Istanbul with 50 teams from 20 countries. The most recent edition was held between the 17th-19th of January 2026. Dates concerning ESDC'27 have not been communicated yet.

== Format ==
Eurasian Schools Debating Championship debates use a special format known as 'World Schools Style Debating' as most of the teams esteem the tournament as a preparation for WSDC. World Schools Style is a combination of the British Parliamentary and Australian formats. In each debate there are eight speeches delivered by two three-member teams (the Proposition and the Opposition). Each speaker delivers an eight-minute speech; then both teams deliver a "reply speech" lasting four minutes, with the last word being reserved for the Proposition. Between the end of the first and the beginning of the last minute of an eight-minute speech, the opposing party may offer "points of information". The speaker may refuse these, but should take at least one or two points during his or her speech.

Teams in ESDC debate six rounds before "breaking" into partial octo-finals. After first round, teams are paired with each other with power pairing. Team with the same number of wins play against each other. If there are more than one teams on the same point, then teams are paired randomly. Top sixteen teams with highest number of wins and speaker points advance into single elimination octo-finals.

== Principles of the Eurasian Schools Debating Championship ==
- Openness: ESDC will remain open to all teams of any formation as long as the space allows
- Flexibility: ESDC will seek to govern itself in a non-bureaucratic way
- Innovation: ESDC will seek to try novel ideas in debating

== Registrations ==
Registrations to ESDC are done through https://www.esdc.info/registration.

== Past championships ==
Year	Champions	Members of Winning Team	Winning Team Coach	Runners-up	ESL Champions	Best Overall Speaker	Venue	Convener	Chief Adjudicator
2026	ARDOR Romania Red	David Saroși, Andrei Gîrcoveanu, Sophia Butac, Sara Gheorghe	Laura Drăgoi	ARDOR Romania Blue	Not Awarded	David Băgăcean	Robert College, Istanbul, Türkiye	Mehveş Hatemi & Ahmet Bera Sevim	Kallina Basli, Klaudia Maciejewska, Reja Debevc, Anı Deniz Gündüz
2025	Team Greece	Artemis Papastavrou, Ellie Kitinou, Kai Yuet Zhang, Marianna Argeiti		CW Pink Flamingo	Not Awarded	Ida Joung	Istanbul, Turkey	Doruk Takım & Defne Aluç	Kallina Basli, Harish Natarajan, Klaudia Maciejewska, Anı Deniz Gündüz
2024	Greece Green	Artemis Papastavrou, Eleana Dalakoura, Kai Yuet Zhang, Marianna Argeiti	George Fragedakis	Greece Blue	Not Awarded	Kai Yuet Zhang	Istanbul, Turkey	Ece Öğrenci & Ayşegül Kula	Kallina Basli & Ruth Selorme Acolatse
2023	Aitchison College			Nixor A	Not Awarded	Ibrahim Qazi	Istanbul, Turkey	Hena Yaman & Tuna Sağdan	Benjamin Goh & Kallina Basli
2022					Not Awarded	Rafay Ahmed	Istanbul, Turkey	Aybala Esmer & Tuna Sağdan	Kallina Basli, Eric Kazadi & Luca Petrović
2021	WSDC Singapore			China Mulan	Not Awarded	Emma Soulanticas	Istanbul, Turkey	Lara Selin Seyahi & Atakan Topaloğlu	Kallina Basli, Tasneem Alias, Sharmila Parmanand & Rok Hafner
2020	Romania Blue				Not Awarded		Istanbul, Turkey	Emir Kırdan & Ilgın Sezer	Serban Pitic
2019	Team Greece Mzansi			Team LGS Paragon	Not Awarded		Istanbul, Turkey	Beliz Aluç & Ege Özgüroğlu	Kallina Basli
2018	Karachi Grammar School			Team Greece Blue	Not Awarded		Istanbul, Turkey	Ece Korkmaz & Aysu Sarıgül	Kip Oebanda & Kallina Basli
2016	Team South Africa			Team Romania Blue	Team Romania Blue		Istanbul, Turkey	Ilayda Orhan & Tolga Ferdi Çalışır	Kip Oebanda & Kallina Basli
2015	Team South Africa			CIS - Hong Kong	Romania Dristor		Istanbul, Turkey	Deniz Keleş & Tayfun Gür	Kip Oebanda
2014	Team Singapore			Gauteng Red	Team Romania		Istanbul, Turkey	Barışcan Göç & Ege Sözgen	Tom McLennan & Kip Oebanda
2013	Team South Africa			Team Canada	Team Romania		Istanbul, Turkey	Ayşenur Biçen (Aisenour Bitsen) & Mert Zorlular	Beth James
2012	Anglo Chinese Junior College			Sweden B	Sweden B		Istanbul, Turkey	Kaan Ülgen & Koret Munguldar	Mehvesh Mumtaz Ahmed & Eirianna Kouri
2011	Team Singapore			Greece C	Greece C		Istanbul, Turkey	Cem Zorlular	Evanthia Giannakouri & Can Talaz

== Future championships ==
The 17th annual Eurasian Schools Debating Championship will be held in January 2027 at Robert College.
