= International Public Debate Association =

- Formation: 1997
- Founded at: San Antonio, TX
- Website: http://www.ipdadebate.info/

The International Public Debate Association (IPDA) is a United States collegiate debate organization founded in 1997 at St. Mary's University in San Antonio, Texas , by Alan Cirlin, Jack Rogers, and Trey Gibson. It promotes “public debate,” a competitive format intended to simulate real-world discourse through limited preparation, extemporaneous delivery, and lay judging. IPDA sanctions tournaments featuring individual (IPDA) and team (TIPDA) debate events, and operates under a governance structure defined by its Constitution and Bylaws.

== Competition format ==
Like a track and field meet, a public debate tournament is a competitive gathering in which individuals compete independently while contributing sweepstakes points to their team. Competitors may earn individual awards within their respective events, and teams may receive overall sweepstakes awards based on cumulative performance. Tournaments sanctioned by the International Public Debate Association (IPDA) feature two primary events: IPDA, a one-on-one debate format, and TIPDA, a two-on-two debate format. Participation in IPDA is organized into four hierarchical divisions—Novice, Junior Varsity, Varsity, and Professional—whereas TIPDA does not employ divisional distinctions.

Tournaments typically last one to three days, depending on the size of the field, the number of scheduled rounds, and whether both IPDA and TIPDA events are offered. Most tournaments consist of multiple preliminary rounds in which all competitors participate, followed by elimination rounds for those who advance based on win–loss record and speaker point scores. A common structure includes six preliminary rounds before the start of elimination rounds, though the exact number may vary by tournament. Competitors who advance compete in successive elimination rounds until winners are determined in each event.
