= Point of information (competitive debate) =

Type of argument in competitive debate

In competitive debate, most commonly in the World Schools, Karl Popper, and British Parliamentary debate styles, a point of information (POI) is when a member of the team opposing that of the current speaker gets to briefly interrupt the current speaker, offering a POI in the form of a question. This may be as a correction, asking for clarity, or just a plain question. As in some debating styles, such as World Schools Style, they often may not be offered in the first or last minute of any speech (known as protected time), or during reply speeches. Points of information may never be offered to a member of the same team.

Points of information are an important part of any debate that includes them, as they offer a much greater degree of engagement between teams. In some styles of debate, such as British Parliamentary Style, they take on an even greater importance, as teams are forced to use them in order to maintain their relevance during a debate. Furthermore, they allow speakers to demonstrate greater wit and presence of thought than is generally possible in a speech, as they are required to respond instantly to prepared points from their opposition in a logical way.

A point of information is also a request for information from the current speaker, in Robert's Rules of Order. The 11th edition of Robert's Rules, published in 2011, changes the name to request for information to clarify its purpose.

== Etiquette ==
In all competitions that allow points of information, their use is restricted by a number of rules to allow the speaker to maintain control of their speech. Generally, the procedure for offering a point of information is as follows:

1. The opposing team member stands, and offers the point.
2. The speaker then either accepts or declines the point, or else offers to accept it at the end of the sentence. The speaker is required to accept in a short statement such as "Taken", "Yes sir/ma'am", and so on. If the speaker wishes, they have the right to decline by saying "No, thank you", "Not taken", and so on
3. If accepted, the debater that offered the point may then briefly interject a point, question or statement. Generally, this must be done in fifteen seconds or less, and the speaker may cut the opposing offer off at any point.
4. The speaker must then immediately answer the point of information.
5. You must not have a conversation with the member of the opposing team when asking or answering a point of information.

A rule of thumb for points of information is that each speaker should accept two during the course of their speech, and offer two to every opposing speaker. Taking fewer points may be interpreted as cowardice when plenty were offered, while speakers that accept too many risk losing control of their speech. Similarly, it is generally frowned upon for speakers to offer excessive POIs in rapid succession, a practice known as badgering or barracking that usually results in the adjudicator calling the debate to order.

Points of Information, as with any other debating technique, are subject to each speaker's own personal style. For instance, while it is broadly accepted that a debater should stand when offering a point of information, there is no set wording or format for the offer itself. Examples of valid offers, that may be combined with any of several common hand gestures, are:

- "On a point of information."
- "May I have this point, sir/miss"
- "On [subject] (e.g., political capital or feasibility)" - however, inserting material like this is heavily frowned upon and often explicitly prohibited in many circuits and formats
- "On that point, sir/miss"
- "POI, sir/ma'am?"
- "Point, sir/ma'am"

Similarly, there is no set way of dealing with a point of information. While a speaker would ideally refute or otherwise deal with it on the spot, it is also acceptable for them to refer the opposing member to another part of their speech (i.e., "I will be dealing with this in greater detail later in my speech."), or to refer the entire point to another of their speakers (i.e., "This point is clearly incorrect. My second speaker will argue..."). While speakers are not explicitly marked for the quality of their points of information or responses to them, they often help to create the impression of skill and improve their overall mark.

== Types ==
Points of information may be offered in several forms, depending on the style of debating being used. The two most common of these are:

- Points of information, where a debater simply offers an argument or question to the speaker.
- Points of misrepresentation, which allow the opposing team to point out that the speaker is misrepresenting its argument or setting up a straw man. This point does not even require the speaker's acceptance, as the mere offer of a point of misrepresentation highlights that the speaker is unfairly treating their opposition.
- Points of informations where you ask for clarification of a statement that is not clearly stated.
