= World Schools Debating Championships =

Annual English-language debating tournament for high school-level teams

World Schools Debating Championships (WSDC)
- insert a caption here
- Status: Active
- Genre: Debate competition
- Frequency: Annually
- Location: Changes annually
- Inaugurated: August 1988 in Canberra, Australia
- Previous event: July 2026 in Nairobi, Kenya
- Next event: July 2027 in Bulgaria
- Reigning Champions (WSDC 2026): Canada
- Website: www.wsdcdebating.org

The World Schools Debating Championships (WSDC) is an annual English-language debating tournament for high school-level teams representing different nations.

== History ==
The championships were first held in August 1988 in Australia, as part of the Australian Bicentenary celebrations. Members of the Australian Debating Federation were aware that the World Universities Debating Championship was to be hosted by the University of Sydney in January that year, but no similar event for high school students existed at the time. However the rapid growth of the university championships since its founding in 1981 showed the potential for international debating competitions. Christopher Erskine took on the task of organising the first world schools championships, which was then called the Bicentennial International School Students Debating Championships. Six nations competed in the inaugural tournament – Australia, Canada, England, Hong Kong, New Zealand and the United States. The teams flew into different cities in Australia for their first debates, before meeting-up in Canberra for the second week of the competition. The event was ultimately won by Canada, who defeated Australia in the Grand Final.

The success of the 1988 event saw Canada offer to host the second championship two years later in 1990. That year, the event was called the World Debating Championships. Seven teams took part in the 1990 competition, with first-time participants Scotland emerging as champions.

In 1991, the championships were held in Edinburgh, and the event took on its present name of the World Schools Debating Championships. Since then, the championships have rapidly grown in size.

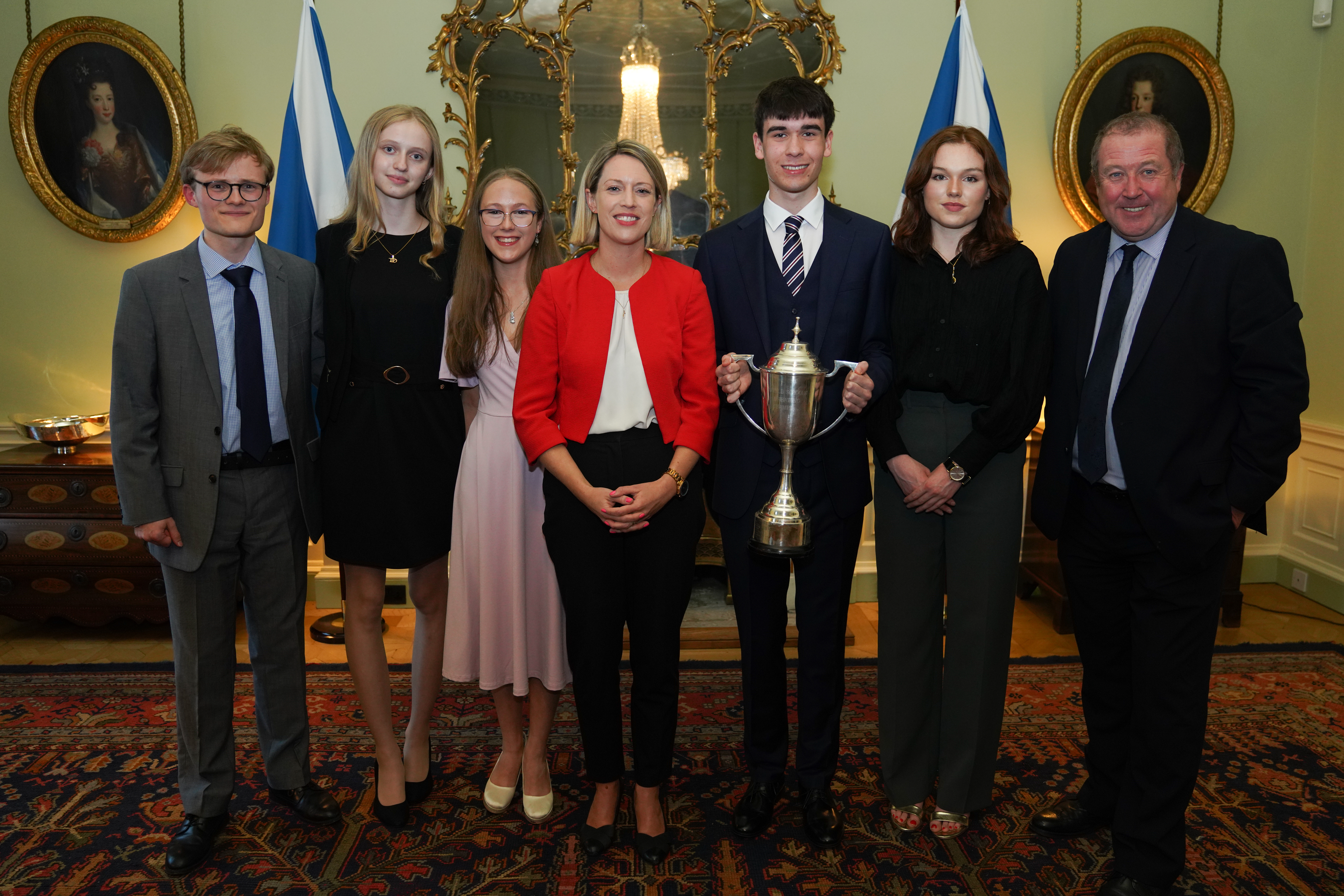
2024 World School's debating champions, Scotland, meet with Cabinet Secretary Jenny Gilruth

Each nation is entitled to enter one team. As with some other international competitions (such as the FIFA World Cup), the nations of the United Kingdom are allowed to take part individually, as are dependent territories (such as Bermuda) and special regions of some countries (such as Hong Kong).

All debates in the championship are in English. This is for practical reasons, but it means that many teams debate in what is for them a foreign language. This has not stopped a number of these teams being very successful. India has secured two world titles, and been a top breaking team for several years whereas China has claimed one. Pakistan and Sri Lanka have reached the Grand Final; while the Philippines, Argentina, Peru, Greece and Israel have all reached the semi-finals. Special awards have been introduced for the highest-ranked teams made-up of English-as-a-second-language (ESL) and English-as-a-foreign-language (EFL) speakers.

To show that debate is universal, hosts in non-English-speaking nations have often showcased demonstration (non-competition) debates in their own language during the championships. Due to the global COVID-19 pandemic, the championship which was due to be held in Mexico City in 2020 was switched to being an Online World Schools Debating Championship, with all the debates conducted through Zoom. The 2021 championship hosted by Macau and the 2022 championship hosted by the Netherlands were also conducted online. In 2023, the championship resumed in person in Hanoi.

== Format ==
World Schools Debating Championship debates use a special format known as 'World Schools Style Debating'. This is a combination of the Asian Parliamentary and Australian formats, designed to meet the needs of the tournament. Each debate comprises a total of eight speeches delivered by two three-member teams (the Proposition and the Opposition). Each speaker delivers an eight-minute speech; then both teams deliver a "reply speech" lasting four minutes, with the last word being reserved for the Proposition. Between the end of the first and the beginning of the last minute of an eight-minute speech, the opposing party may offer "points of information". The speaker may refuse these, but should take at least one or two points during his or her speech.

The style of debate was originally a compromise and not used apart from the championship. However, the style has since been embraced by many countries for their national competitions, including Argentina, Australia, Bahrain, Bangladesh, Germany, Greece, Indonesia, Israel, Lithuania, New Zealand, Nigeria, Pakistan, Singapore, Slovenia, South Africa, South Korea, Sri Lanka and Wales.

The WSDC normally takes place over the course of ten days. Each national team competes in eight preliminary debates: two prepared debates (the motion having been announced a few weeks before the start of the tournament) and six impromptu debates (for which teams have one hour to prepare). Once the eight preliminary rounds have been completed, the 16 best teams compete in knock-out debates (known as the Octofinals) culminating in a Grand Final. In some instances, such as the 2024 Serbia WSDC, knock out debates begin at the "Double-Octofinals" of 32 teams. For each debate, a panel of three judges (or more in later rounds) mark each debater on their content, style and strategy on speaker score between 60-80. The speaker score of most debaters are in the low 70s, with the highest scoring individual usually scoring below 75. The reply speech is scored on a scale between 30-40. In each debate, the team with the most 'ballots' win the debate. Each judge has one ballot, which they give to the team they believe won the debate, by convention the team with the higher total speaker score.

In deciding which teams proceed to the knock-out rounds, the WSDC has a systematic standard of determination. Teams are ranked on the number of wins they have. If teams are tied on the number of wins, they will then be separated on the number of ballots given to the team. If the number of ballots are tied, rankings are then determined based on the average speaker scores of the teams. Teams which score above a particular ranking will then qualify for the knock out rounds.

In determining the number of teams that proceed to the knockout rounds, the rules is as follows: If there are 12 teams or fewer, 4 teams will qualify for the knock out rounds (Semi finals); if there are 13-24 teams, 8 teams will qualify for the knock out rounds (Quarter finals); if there are 25-47 teams, 16 teams will qualify for the knock out rounds (Octo finals). If there is more than 47 teams, the following metric is used:

- If 24 or fewer teams win 5 or more preliminary round debates, 24 teams shall qualify for the knock-out rounds,
- If more than 24 but less than 32 teams win 5 or more preliminary round debates, the number of teams which qualify for the knock-out rounds shall be the number of teams which won 5 or more preliminary round debates or half the number of teams competing in the preliminary rounds (rounded down to the nearest whole number), whichever is the smaller number of teams
- If 32 or more teams win 5 or more preliminary round debates, the number of teams which qualify for the knock-out rounds shall be 32 teams or half the number of teams competing in the preliminary rounds (rounded down to the nearest whole number), whichever is the smaller number of teams

If there 24-32 teams qualifying for the knock-out rounds, the following formula is used:

Teams qualifying for the knock-out rounds	Teams proceeding directly to the Octofinals	Team participating in the Partial Double Octofinals
24	8	16
25	7	18
26	6	20
27	5	22
28	4	24
29	3	26
30	2	28
31	1	30
32	0	32

A notable difference between WSDC and the World Individual Debating and Public Speaking Championships – the other major international competition of its type – is that WSDC's primary focus is on ranking each country's team as opposed to its individual participants.

== Charter of the World Schools Debating Championships ==
The aims of the World Schools Debating Championships are:

- To encourage and advance the education of young people in communication skills through conducting debating events.
- To achieve excellence in debating by young people through annually conducting the World Schools Debating Championships.
- To promote international understanding and free speech through debating to help young people develop their capabilities that they may grow to full maturity as individuals and members of society.

In order to further these aims, all participating nations agree that:

- The team of any participating nation may be required to debate any issue.
- The team of any participating nation may be required to debate against the team of any other participating nation.
- The team of any participating nation is entitled to take part in the Championships on the same basis as any other participating nation's team.

== Past championships ==
Year	Champions	Runners-up	Semi-finalists	Quarter-finalists	Venue	Best Speaker
2026	Canada	India	Kenya & Pakistan	United States & Greece & Singapore & Germany	Nairobi, Kenya	Aayush Appan, United States
2025	India	Australia	Hong Kong & Singapore	Bangladesh & Bulgaria & South Africa & United States	Panama City, Panama	Cailyn Min, United States
2024	Scotland	Bulgaria	Qatar & Greece	South Korea & Taiwan & Singapore & England	Belgrade, Serbia	Jinjou Wang, Canada
2023	United States	Canada	Malaysia & Scotland	Hong Kong & India & Sri Lanka & Zimbabwe	Hanoi, Vietnam	Annushka Agarwal, Canada
2022	Hong Kong	China	Singapore & Sri Lanka	Ireland & Bangladesh & Malaysia & Canada	Online Championship (organised by the Netherlands)	Bowser Liu, China
2021	Canada	Hong Kong	Philippines & Singapore	Malaysia & China & Pakistan & Romania	Online Championship (organised by Macau with assistance from Germany)	Tobi Leung, Philippines
The 2020 online championship was held after the 2020 championship in Mexico was cancelled due to the global Covid-19 pandemic.
2020	Canada	Sri Lanka	Ireland & Singapore		Online Championship (organised by Mexico with assistance from Macau)	Ivan Buckland, South Africa & Jenna Hong, Hong Kong
2019	India	Canada	China & England		Bangkok, Thailand	Tejas Subramaniam, India
2018	China	India	England & Singapore		Zagreb, Croatia	Dhananjay Ashok, India
2017	Singapore	England	South Africa & United States		Bali, Indonesia	Kenza Wilks, England
2016	England	Canada	Australia & Hong Kong		Stuttgart, Germany	Eden Blair, Australia
2015	Singapore	Canada	Australia & Pakistan		Singapore	Kate Dewey, South Africa
2014	England	South Africa	Canada & Ireland		Bangkok, Thailand	Will Cook, England
2013	Australia	Eswatini	Ireland & Singapore		Antalya, Turkey	Bo Seo, Australia
2012	Scotland	Wales	England & Philippines		Cape Town, South Africa	Teoh Ren Jie, Singapore
2011	Singapore	Australia	Ireland & Scotland		Dundee, Scotland	Teoh Ren Jie, Singapore
2010	Canada	England	Singapore & Wales		Doha, Qatar	Joanna Connolly, Australia
2009	New Zealand	England	Greece & Singapore		Athens, Greece	
2008	England	New Zealand	Greece & Scotland		Washington DC, United States	
2007	Scotland	Singapore	Canada & England		Seoul, South Korea	
2006	Australia	Ireland	Canada & Singapore		Cardiff, Wales	
2005	Australia	England	Argentina & Pakistan		Calgary, Canada	
2004	Australia	South Africa	England & Greece		Stuttgart, Germany	
2003	Australia	Singapore	England & Scotland		Lima, Peru	
2002	Ireland	Australia	England & Scotland		Singapore	
2001	Australia	Scotland	Singapore & South Africa		Johannesburg, South Africa	
2000	Australia	England	Israel & New Zealand		Pittsburgh, United States	
1999	Scotland	England	Australia & United States		London, England	
1998	Australia	Scotland	New Zealand & Peru		Jerusalem, Israel	
1997	Australia	England	Pakistan & Singapore		Bermuda	
1996	England	Pakistan	Scotland & Singapore		Canberra, Australia	
1995	New Zealand	Scotland	Australia & England		Cardiff, Wales	
1994	United States	Pakistan	Australia & Scotland		New Zealand	
1993	England	Scotland	Australia & United States		Medicine Hat, Canada	
1992	New Zealand	Scotland			London, England	
1991	New Zealand	Australia			Edinburgh, Scotland	
1990	Scotland	Australia			Winnipeg, Canada	
1989	not held					
1988	Canada	Australia			Australia	

== Future championships ==
The 2027 championships are due to be held in Sofia, Bulgaria.

== Best New Team award ==
In some years in which there have been a significant number of nations entering the championships for the first time, an award for the Best New Team has been given to the top-ranking team from one of these nations.

Year	Best New Team
2026	South Sudan
2025	Guatemala
2024	Portugal
2023	France
2022	Finland
2021	North Macedonia
Online Championship in 2020
2020	Brazil & Namibia
2019	Oman
2018	Northern Ireland
2017	Vietnam
2016	Rwanda
2015	Bahrain
2014	Macau
2013	-
2012	Eswatini
2011	Barbados
2010	United Arab Emirates
2009	Thailand

== Best speakers ==
The speaker tab is determined by debaters' performance in the 8 preliminary rounds. For a speaker to be eligible for the speaker tab, they must speak in a minimum of 4 out of the 8 debates. The average of a debater's speaker scores is used when ranking individual debaters.

In the online editions of the championship (2020, 2021, 2022), teams debated their preliminary rounds in two separate divisions which grouped nations together by timezone. In 2020, the top speakers of the two divisions were awarded separately. In both 2021 & 2022, the speaker tabs of the two divisions were merged to determine the best speakers in each category.

Year	Best Overall Speaker	Best ESL Speaker	Best EFL Speaker
2026	Aayush Appan (United States)	Savith Mindith Wijesundara (Sri Lanka)	Shun Yokoyama (Japan)
2025	Cailyn Min (United States)	Veda Kalra (India)	Dragos Cristian Matei (Romania)
2024	Jinjou Wang (Canada)	Clement Tsao (China)	Alicia Chen (China)
2023	Annushka Agarwal (Canada)	Hitishaa Goyal (India)	Raphael Lamballe (China)
2022	Bowser Liu (China)	Bowser Liu (China)	Madeleine Tempelman (Netherlands) & Milda Gadliauskaite (Lithuania)
2021	Robert Leung (Philippines)	Jacquelynn Lin (China)	Maibritt Henkel (Denmark)
2020	Ivan Buckland (South Africa) & Jenna Hong (Hong Kong)	Jane Sonamai (Wales) & Ananya Ganesh (India)	Marilena Hadjicosta (Greece) & Rina Kajitani (Japan)
2019	Tejas Subramaniam (India)	Tejas Subramaniam (India)	Sami Petersen (Denmark)
2018	Dhananjay Ashok (India)	Dhananjay Ashok (India)	Smaranda-Ioana Morosanu (Romania)
2017	Kenza Wilks (England)	Nicholas Kim (South Korea)	Annika Høi (Denmark)
2016	Eden Blair (Australia)	Kishen Sivabalan (Malaysia)	Clara Granborg Juul (Denmark)
2015	Kate Dewey (South Africa)	Kishen Sivabalan (Malaysia)	Floris Holstege (Netherlands)
2014	Will Cook (England)	Nishanth Selvalingam (Malaysia)	Regina Cara Riantoputra (Indonesia)
2013	Bo Seo (Australia)	Siddarth Srikanth (India)	Carissa Tehputri (Indonesia)
2012	Teoh Ren Jie (Singapore)	Sun Young Hwang (South Korea)	Chan Keun Kim (South Korea)
2011	Teoh Ren Jie (Singapore)	Ye Eun Chun (South Korea)	Chan Keun Kim (South Korea)
2010	Joanna Connolly (Australia)	Shehryar Sheikh (Pakistan)	Lionie Beyrle (Germany)

== See also ==
- Debating
- World Schools Style debate
- Parliamentary style debate
