= Debate =

Formal conversation, often between opposing viewpoints, on a topic

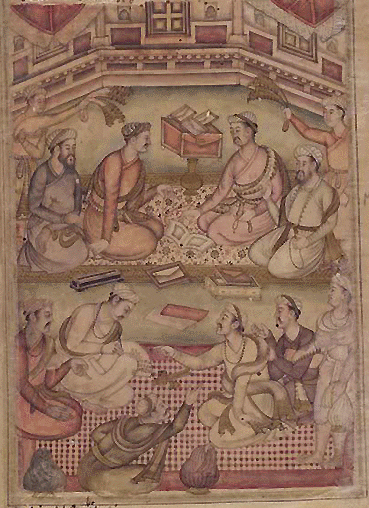
A Debate among Scholars, Razmnama illustration

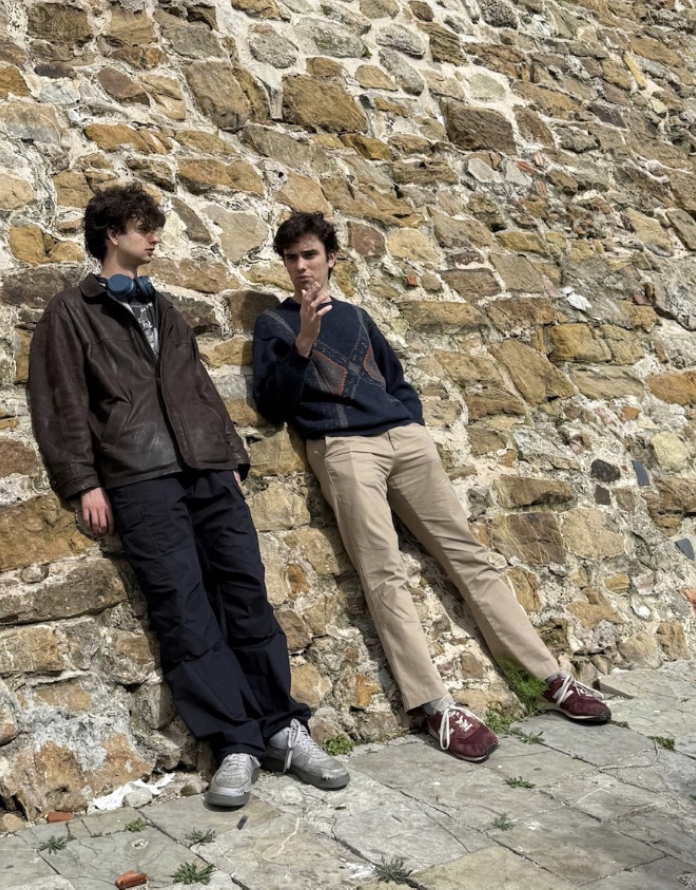
Two men engage in recreational debate

Debate is a process that involves formal discourse, discussion, and oral addresses on a particular collection of topics, often with a moderator and an audience. In a debate, arguments are put forward for opposing viewpoints. Historically, debates have occurred in public meetings, academic institutions, debate halls, coffeehouses, competitions, and legislative assemblies. Debates have also been conducted for educational and recreational purposes, usually associated with educational establishments and debating societies. These debates emphasize logical consistency, factual accuracy, and emotional appeal to an audience. Modern competitive debate also includes rules for participants to discuss and decide upon the framework of the debate (how it will be judged).

The term "debate" may also apply to a more continuous, inclusive, and less formalized process through which issues are explored and resolved across a range of agencies and among the general public. For example, the European Commission in 2021 published a Green Paper on Ageing, intended to generate such a debate on "policies to address the challenges and opportunities of ageing" in the upcoming years. Pope Francis has also referred to the "need for forthright and honest debate" on society and the environment in his 2015 encyclical letter Laudato si'.

== History ==
Debating in various forms has a long history that can be traced back to the philosophical and political debates of Ancient Greece, such as Athenian Democracy or the Shastrartha in Ancient India.

In Imperial China's Han Dynasty, debate amongst scholars was most famously portrayed in a series of debates known as the Discourses on Salt and Iron, held in 81 BCE. Named by Emperor Zhao for its two most famous debates, those debates focused on the reformation of the economic policies implemented by Zhao's predecessor, Emperor Wu. A form of informal debate known as Qingtan developed out of the Xuanxue school of Chinese philosophy following the collapse of the Han Dynasty among Daoist scholars. The debates, which later grew to include Confucians and Buddhists, commonly discussed metaphysics and literature.

Modern forms of debating and the establishment of debating societies in the Western world occurred during the Age of Enlightenment in the 18th century.

=== Emergence of debating societies ===
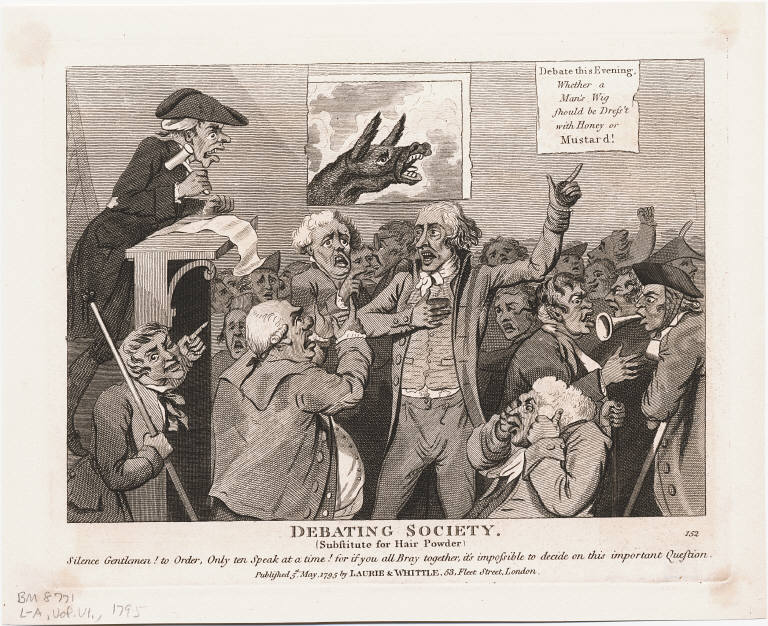
Debate Tonight: Whether a man's wig should be dressed with honey or mustard!, a 1795 cartoon satirizing the content of debates

Trinity College Dublin boasts two of Europe's oldest debating societies: The Hist in 1770, inspired by a debating club created by Edmund Burke in 1747, and The Phil, founded in 1683. The Society of Cogers was founded in London in 1755 and still operates today. Debating societies had emerged in London in the early 18th century, and soon became a prominent societal fixture of life in London. Although debating societies had existed in London since at least 1740, they were exclusive and secretive societies. However, by the mid-18th century, London fostered a vibrant debating society culture, largely due to increased membership from London's growing middle class. The topics debated covered a broad spectrum, and debating societies allowed participants from all genders and social backgrounds, making them an example of the enlarged public sphere of the Age of Enlightenment. Debating societies were a phenomenon associated with the simultaneous rise of the public sphere. A sphere of discussion, separate from traditional authorities and accessible to all people, acted as a platform for criticism and the development of new ideas and philosophy.

John Henley, a clergyman, founded an Oratory in 1726 with the principal aim of "reforming the manner in which public presentations should be performed". He extensively utilized the print industry to advertise the events of his Oratory, establishing it as a ubiquitous part of the London public sphere. Henley also played a crucial role in shaping the space of the debating club; he introduced two platforms to his room in the Newport district of London for the staging of debates and organized the entrances to facilitate the collection of admission fees. These modifications were further carried out when Henley relocated his enterprise to Lincoln's Inn Fields. With the public now willing to pay for entertainment, Henley capitalized on the growing commercialization of British society. By the 1770s, debating societies had become a firmly established part of London society.

The year 1785 was pivotal: The Morning Chronicle announced on March 26:

The Rage for public debate now shows itself in all quarters of the metropolis. Exclusive of the oratorical assemblies at Carlisle House, Freemasons Hall, the Forum, Spring Gardens, the Casino, the Mitre Tavern, and other polite places of debating rendezvous, we hear that new Schools of Eloquence are preparing to be opened in St. Giles, Clare-Market, Hockley in the Hole, Whitechapel, Rag-Fair, Duke's Place, Billingsgate, and the Back of the Borough.

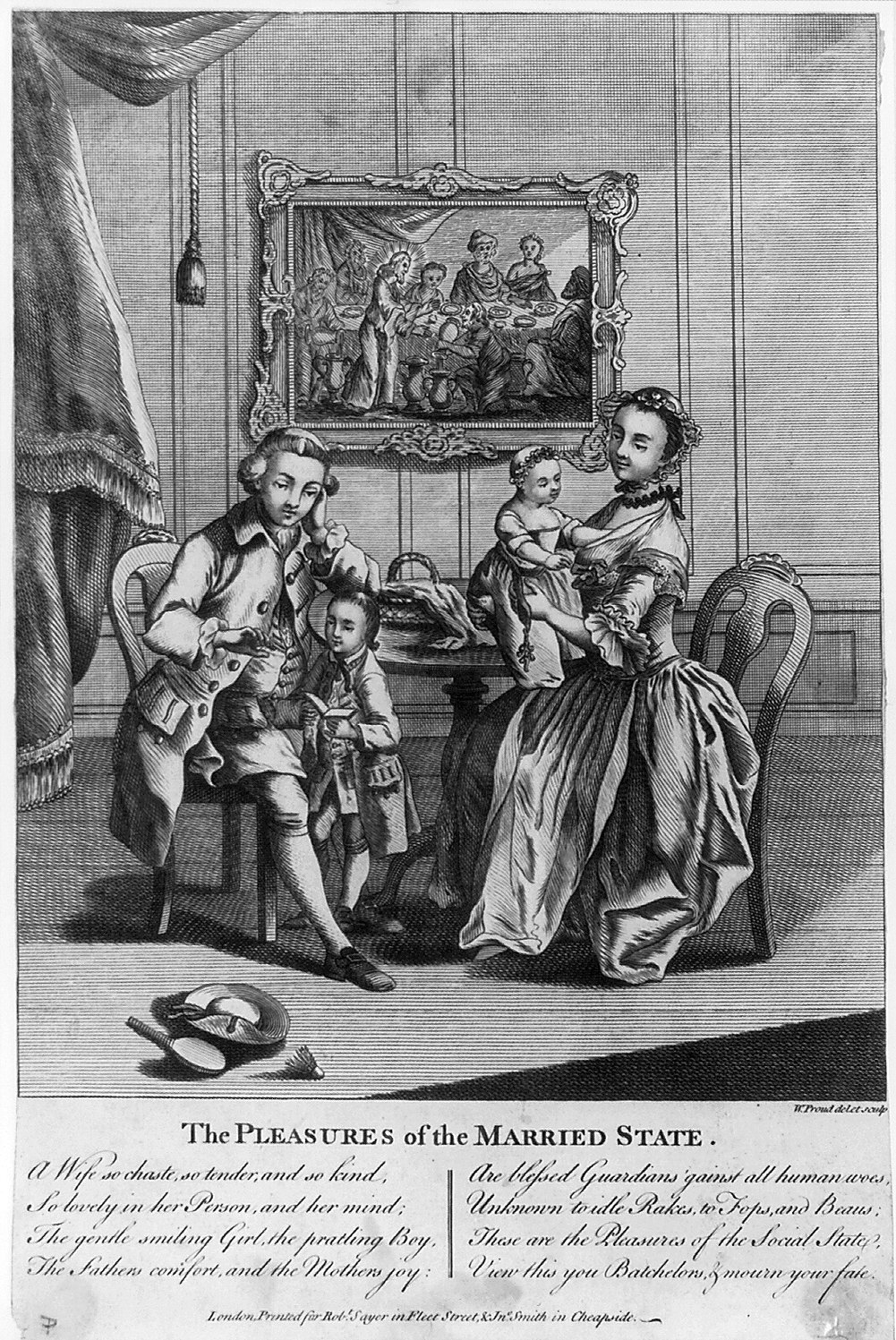
Many subjects were debated in the London Debating Societies of the 18th century. This is a cover to a panegyric on marriage and family life, c. 1780.

In 1780, 35 distinct societies advertised and hosted debates accommodating between 650 and 1200 individuals. The topic for debate was introduced by a president or moderator, who then moderated the discussion. Speakers were allotted specific time frames to present their arguments, and, following the debate, a vote was conducted to reach a conclusion or to adjourn the topic for further deliberation. Speakers were prohibited from slandering or insulting other speakers or straying from the designated topic, underscoring the premium placed on politeness by late 18th-century debaters.

=== Student debating societies ===
Princeton University in the future United States of America was home to several short-lived student debating societies throughout the mid-1700s. The American Whig Society at the university was co-founded in 1765 by future revolutionary James Madison.

The Dialectic and Philanthropic Societies were formed at the University of North Carolina at Chapel Hill in 1795 and are still active. They are considered the first of the post-revolutionary debating societies.

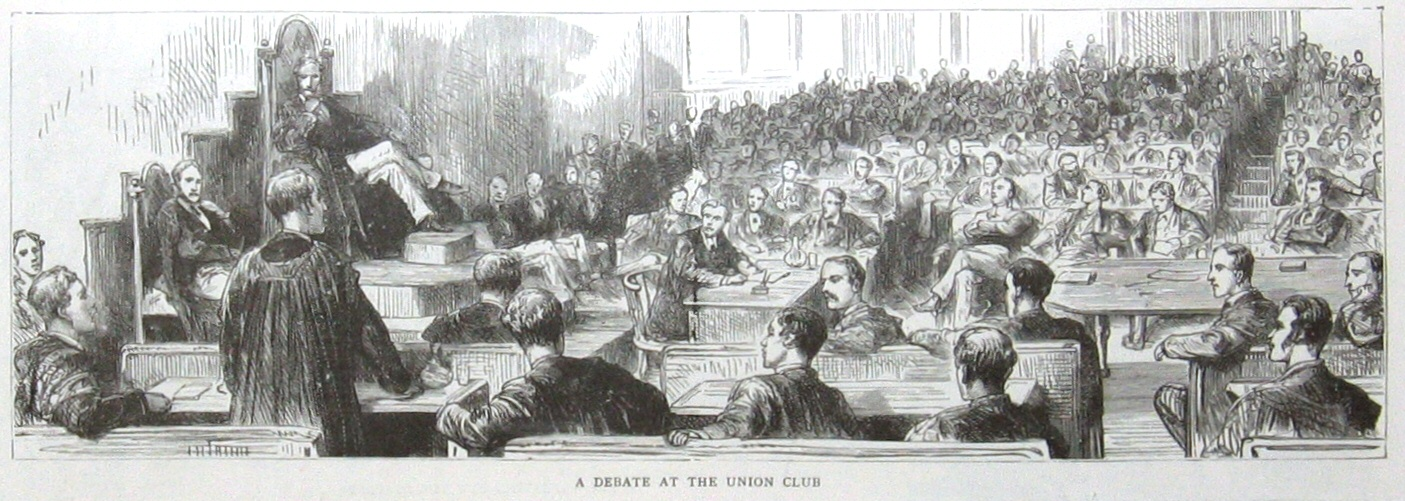
A debate at the Cambridge Union Society (c. 1887)

The first student debating society in Great Britain was the St Andrews Debating Society, formed in 1794 as the Literary Society. The Cambridge Union Society was founded in 1815 and claims to be the oldest continually operating debating society in the World.

Over the next few decades, similar debate societies emerged at several other prominent universities, including the Oxford Union, the Durham Union, the Yale Political Union, and the Conférence Olivaint.

== Political debate ==
=== Parliamentary debate ===
In parliaments and other legislatures, members debate proposals regarding legislation before voting on resolutions, which become laws. Debates are usually conducted by proposing a law, or changes to a law known as amendments. Parliamentary-style debates are structured with two opposing sides, the Opposition (OPP) and the Government (GOV). After each side is allowed to speak once, members are permitted to give reply speeches to the opposing side's points. Afterward, members of the parliament discuss the proposal before casting their votes for or against such a law. The first example of parliamentary debate took place in Liverpool in 1882.

Although Britain invented the system of parliamentary debate, it is not the only modern country to use a parliamentary system. Countries today that use a parliamentary system and parliamentary debate include Canada, Italy, Japan, Latvia, the Netherlands, and New Zealand.

In addition to government settings, the structure of parliamentary debate has also influenced academic debate formats. The Asian Parliamentary style which includes two teams of three speakers who engage in speeches. This style of debating is widely practiced in Asian Countries such as Japan, Malaysia and Taiwan.

=== Participatory democracy ===
Participatory democracy is a form of government in which citizens are directly involved in political decision-making, often through mechanisms such as public debate.

In France, the procedure for public debate was defined in the Law of February 2, 1995 relating to the re-enforcement of the protection of the environment (commonly known as the Barnier Law, after the then minister for the environment).

=== Emergency debating ===
In some countries (e.g., Canada and the UK), members of parliament may request debates on urgent matters of national importance. According to Standing Order rules, an emergency debate may take precedence on Friday, or if the Speaker decides, at the next sitting within normal hours. The Speaker also determines when any other regular business, superseded by the emergency debate, is considered or discarded.

=== Debate between candidates for high office ===
In jurisdictions that elect holders of high political office, such as the President or Prime Minister, candidates sometimes debate in public, usually during a general election campaign.

==== U.S. presidential debates ====
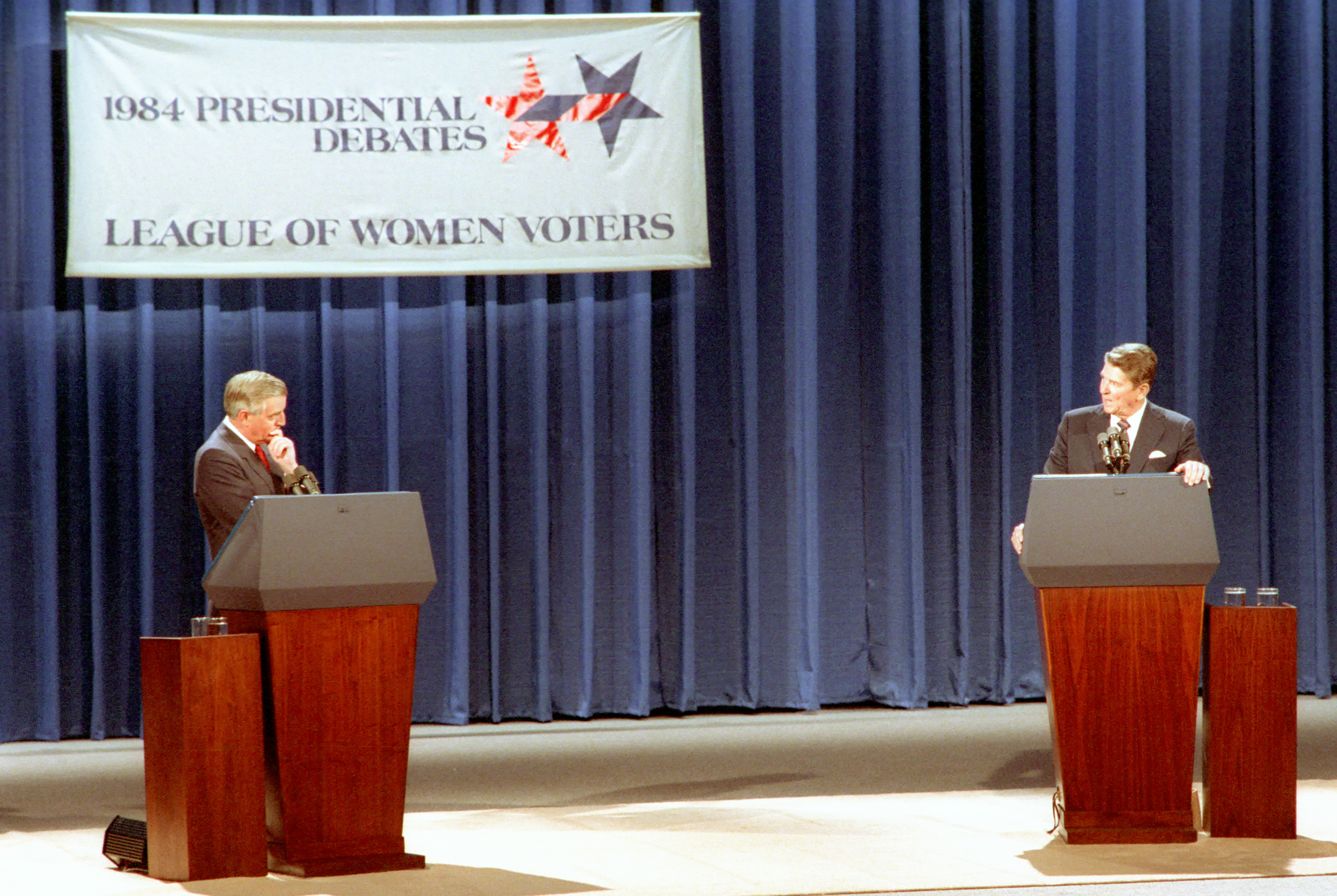
Walter Mondale (left) and Ronald Reagan during the 1984 United States presidential debates

Since the 1976 general election, debates between presidential candidates have been a part of U.S. presidential campaigns. Unlike debates sponsored at the high school or collegiate level, the participants and format are not independently defined. Nevertheless, in a campaign season heavily dominated by television advertisements, talk radio, sound bites, and spin, they still offer a rare opportunity for citizens to see and hear the major candidates side by side. The format of the presidential debates, though defined differently in every election, is typically more restrictive than many traditional formats, forbidding participants to ask each other questions and restricting discussion of particular topics to short time frames.

The presidential debates were initially moderated in 1976, 1980, and 1984 by the League of Women Voters, and the Commission on Presidential Debates (CPD) was established in 1987 by the Republican and Democratic parties. The presidential debate's primary purpose is to sponsor and produce debates for the United States presidential and vice-presidential candidates in a nonpartisan environment. The organization, which is a nonprofit, nonpartisan corporation, sponsored all of the presidential debates in 1988, 1992, 1996, 2000, 2004, 2008, 2012, 2016, 2020 and 2024.

However, in announcing its withdrawal from sponsoring the debates, the League of Women Voters stated that it was withdrawing "because the demands of the two campaign organizations would perpetrate a fraud on the American voter." In 2004, the Citizens' Debate Commission was formed in the hope of establishing an independent sponsor for presidential debates, with a more voter-centric role in the definition of the participants, format, and rules.

== Competitive debate ==
In competitive debates, teams compete against each other and are judged the winner by a list of criteria that is usually based around the concepts of "content, style, and strategy". There are numerous styles of competitive debating, organizations, and rules, and competitive debates are held across the world at all levels.

Competitive debating is most commonly found in secondary schools and institutions of higher education, especially in the United States, where competitive debating is often known as forensics or speech and debate. Many countries often also hold tournaments in competitive debates between different schools.

=== Australasia debating ===
The Australasian style of debate consists of two teams of three people, debating a topic. The topic is presented in the form of an affirmative statement beginning with "That" or "This House", for example, "That cats are better than dogs", or "This House should raise taxes". Most topics are usually specific to local Australian regions to facilitate participant and audience interest.

Each of the six speakers (three affirmative and three negative) speak in succession to each other, beginning with the Affirmative Team. The speaking order is as follows: First Affirmative, First Negative, Second Affirmative, Second Negative, Third Affirmative, and finally Third Negative. The debate is finished with a closing argument by the last speaker from each team. "Points of Information" (an interrupting question), more commonly known as "POIs", are used in Australian and New Zealand Secondary School level debating.

The context in which the Australasian style of debate is used varies, but in Australia and New Zealand, it is primarily used at the primary and secondary school levels.

=== European square debating ===
European square debating has a Paris-style inspired format with four teams. France, the United Kingdom, and Germany are always represented, in addition to one other major European nation (for example, Russia). These "Nations" then confront each other in a policy debate on European issues, as parts of two broad coalitions. Each team is composed of two speakers (the Prime Minister and the Foreign Secretary). The debate starts with the first speaker from France, followed by the first speaker of Germany (the opposite side), followed by the second speaker of France, and the second speaker of Germany. The debate continues with the first speaker of the United Kingdom, followed by the first speaker of Russia, and it goes on with the respective second speakers. Each debater speaks for 5 minutes. The first and the last minutes are protected time: no Points of Information may be asked. During the rest of the speech, the speaker may be interrupted by Points of Information (POIs) from the opposite countries (debaters from France and the UK may ask POIs from debaters representing Germany and Russia, and vice versa, respectively). The format forces each debater to develop a winning strategy while respecting the coalition. This format was commonly developed by the Franco-British Comparative Project and Declan McCavanna, Chairman of the FDA and featured France, the UK, Germany, Russia and Italy.

=== Impromptu debating ===
Impromptu debating is a relatively informal style of debate compared to other highly structured formats. The topic is given to participants 15 to 20 minutes before the debate begins. The format is straightforward: each team member speaks for 5 minutes, with speakers alternating between sides. This is followed by a 10-minute discussion period (similar to the "open cross-examination" time in other formats) and then a 5-minute break, comparable to preparation time in other formats. After the break, each team delivers a 4-minute rebuttal.

Impromptu debate is often considered more akin to public speaking, as speeches can range from stand-up routines to discussions about the reputations of nations, depending on the topic assigned to the contestants. At the start of the event, contestants receive a list of abstract topics from which they select one and prepare a speech.

=== Lincoln–Douglas debating ===
Lincoln-Douglas debating is primarily a form of United States high school debate (though there is a collegiate Lincoln-Douglas debate) and is named after the 1858 Lincoln-Douglas debates. It is a 1-on-1 event that applies philosophical theories to real-world issues. The debaters normally alternate sides from round to round as either the "affirmative", which upholds the resolution, or the "negative", which attacks it. The resolution, which changes bimonthly, generally asks whether a certain policy or action conforms to a specific value. National Forensic Association Lincoln-Douglas debate (NFA-LD), the collegiate Lincoln-Douglas debate, uses one resolution per academic year, and is a 1-on-1 form of policy debate.

Though established as an alternative to policy debate, there has been a strong movement to embrace certain techniques that originated in policy debate. Traditional LD debate attempts to be free of policy debate "jargon". Lincoln-Douglas speeches can range in speed from a conversational pace to well over 300 words per minute. This technique of fast-talking is often called spreading and is also prevalent in policy debates.

=== Mace debating ===
The Mace debating style is prominent in Britain and Ireland at the school level and is composed of two teams of two people, debating a motion, which one team will propose, and the other will oppose. Each speaker will make a seven-minute speech in the order; 1st Proposition, 1st Opposition, 2nd Proposition, 2nd Opposition. After the first minute of each speech, members of the opposing team may request a 'point of information' (POI). If the speaker accepts, they are permitted to ask a question. POIs are used to attack a speaker on a weak point or to argue against something the speaker said. After all four debaters have spoken, the debate will be opened to the floor, in which members of the audience will question the teams. Finally, one speaker from each team will speak for 4 minutes. In these summary speeches, the speaker will answer the questions posed by the floor and opposition, before summarizing their key points. The Mace format of the debate is designed to be beginner-friendly and to prepare students for British Parliamentary style debate (which it is modeled on).

=== Oxford-style debating ===
Derived from the Oxford Union debating society of Oxford University, Oxford-style debating is a competitive debate format featuring a sharply assigned motion that is proposed by one side and opposed by another. Oxford-style debates follow a formal structure that begins with audience members casting a pre-debate vote on the motion that is either for, against, or undecided. Each panelist presents a seven-minute opening statement, after which the moderator takes questions from the audience with inter-panel challenges. Finally, each panelist delivers a 2-minute closing argument, and the audience delivers their second (and final) vote for comparison against the first. A winner is then declared either by the majority or by which team has swayed more audience members between the two votes.

=== Paris-style debating ===
In Paris debating, two teams of five debate a given motion. One team will attempt to defend the motion while the other team will attack the motion. The debate is judged on the quality of the arguments, the strength of the rhetoric, the charisma of the speaker, the quality of the humor, the ability to think on one's feet, and teamwork. Despite this format being specifically used in France debates are commonly held in English.

The first speaker of the Proposition (Prime Minister) opens the debate, followed by the first speaker of the Opposition (Shadow Prime Minister), then the second speaker of the Proposition, and so forth.

Each speaker speaks for six minutes. Between the first and last minute, debaters from the opposing team may request Points of Information, which the speaker may accept or decline at their discretion (although it is customary to accept at least one, and recommended to accept two).

The French Debating Association organizes its National Debating Championship in this style.

=== Parliamentary style debating ===
Parliamentary debate is conducted under rules originally derived from British parliamentary procedure, though parliamentary debate now has several variations, including American, Brazilian, British, Canadian, and German forms. It features the competition of individuals in a multi-person setting. It borrows terms such as "government" and "opposition" from the British parliament (although the term "proposition" is sometimes used rather than "government" when debating in the United Kingdom).

Parliamentary debate is practiced worldwide and many international variations have been created. The premier event in the world of parliamentary debate is the World Universities Debating Championship. This tournament is conducted in the traditional British Parliamentary style of debate.

=== Policy debating ===
Policy debate is a fast-paced form of debate most commonly practiced in the U.S. Policy debate is composed of two teams of two that will advocate for and against a resolution (typically a proposed policy for the United States federal government or an international organization). Affirmative teams generally present a proposal to implement a specific modified form of the resolution called a plan. The negative will either try to disprove or undermine this plan or display that the opportunity costs of their opponent's plan are so great that it should not be implemented. Policy Debate is sometimes also referred to as cross-examination debate (shortened to CX) because of the 3-minute questioning periods following each constructive speech.

=== Public debating ===
Public debate may mean simply debating by the public, or in public. The term is also used for a particular formal style of debate in a competitive or educational context. Two teams of two compete through six rounds of argument, giving persuasive speeches on a particular topic.

=== Public forum debating ===
"Public forum" debating combines aspects of both policy debate and Lincoln-Douglas debate but makes them easily understood by the general public by having shorter speech lengths, an absence of jargon, and longer questioning periods, called "cross-fires," where the debaters interact. This form of debate is also designed to address current affairs, with topics that change monthly and address both U.S. policy and international issues. This form of debate is primarily found within the United States. The core basis of this type of debate is that anyone is eligible to become a judge for the debate, unlike the Policy debate or Lincoln-Douglas debate, which requires more experience in debate to judge.

=== Tibetan Buddhist debating ===
This is a traditional Buddhist form of debating that was influenced by earlier Indian forms. Largely developed in Tibet, this style includes two individuals, one functioning as the Challenger (questioner) and the other as the Defender (answerer). The debaters must depend on their memorization of the points of doctrine, definitions, illustrations, and even whole text, together with their measure of understanding gained from instruction and study.

Characteristics that uniquely define the Tibetan Buddhist style of debating are ceremonial recitation and symbolic movements and hand gestures by debaters. At the opening of a debate, the standing Challenger claps his hands together and invokes Manjushri, who is the manifestation of the wisdom of all the Buddhas and, as such, is the special deity of debate.

When the Challenger first puts their question to the sitting Defender, their right hand is held above the shoulder at the level of their head, and the left hand is stretched forward with the palm turned upward. At the end of their statement, the Challenger punctuates by loudly clapping together their hands and simultaneously stomping their left foot. They then stylistically drawback their right hand slowly with the palm held upward and, at the same time, hold forth their left hand with the palm turned downward. Holding forth the left hand after clapping symbolizes closing the door to rebirth in samsara. The drawing back and raising of the right hand symbolizes one's will to raise all sentient beings out of samsara, and cyclic existence, and to establish them in the omniscience of Buddhahood. The left hand represents "Wisdom" (the "antidote" to cyclic existence, and the right hand represents "Method"), the altruistic intention to become enlightened for the benefit of all. The clap represents a union of Method and Wisdom.

=== Turncoat debating ===
In this debating style, the same speaker shifts allegiance between "For" and "Against" the motion. It is a solo contest, unlike other debating forms. Here, the speaker is required to speak for 2 minutes "For the motion", 2 minutes "Against the motion", and finally draw up a 1-minute conclusion in which the speaker balances the debate. At the end of the fifth minute, the debate will be opened to the house, in which members of the audience will put questions to the candidate, which they will have to answer. In the Turncoat format, the emphasis is on transitions, the strength of argument, and the balancing of opinions.

== International groups and events ==
=== Asian Universities Debating Championship ===
United Asian Debating Championship is the biggest university debating tournament in Asia, where teams from the Middle East to Japan come to debate. It is traditionally hosted in Southeast Asia, where participation is usually highest compared to other parts of Asia.

Asian debates are largely an adaptation of the Australasian format. The only difference is that each speaker is given 7 minutes of speech time, and there will be points of information (POI) offered by the opposing team between the 2nd to 6th minutes of the speech. A point of information (POI) is an opportunity for opponent debaters to formally inject in the speech of the current speaker, and it may take the form of a question, clarification, callout or a brief rebuttal, and must remain within the 15 second limit. This means that the 1st and 7th minute is considered the 'protected' period where no POIs can be offered to the speaker.

The debate will commence with the Prime Minister's speech (first proposition) and will be continued by the first opposition. This alternating speech will go on until the third opposition. Following this, the opposition bench will give the reply speech. In the reply speech, the opposition goes first and then the proposition. The debate ends when the proposition ends the reply speech. Four minutes are allocated for the reply speech, and no POIs can be offered during this time.

=== International Public Debate Association ===
The International Public Debate Association (IPDA) is a United States collegiate debate organization founded in 1997 at St. Mary's University in San Antonio, Texas , by Alan Cirlin, Jack Rogers, and Trey Gibson. It promotes “public debate,” a competitive format intended to simulate real-world discourse through limited preparation, extemporaneous delivery, and lay judging. IPDA sanctions tournaments featuring individual (IPDA) and team (TIPDA) debate events, and operates under a governance structure defined by its Constitution and Bylaws.

== Other forms of debate ==
=== Online debating ===
Live broadcast online political debate (2022)

With the increasing popularity and availability of the Internet, differing opinions arise frequently. Though they are often expressed via flaming and other forms of argumentation, which consist primarily of assertions, formalized debating websites do exist. The debate style varies from site to site, with local communities and cultures developing. Some sites promote a contentious atmosphere that can border on "flaming" (the personal insult of your opponent, also known as a type of ad hominem fallacy), while others strictly admonish such activities and strongly promote independent research and better arguments.And as a result of the Covid-19 pandemic, debating culture drastically transformed by pushing competitions to being fully online. Virtual tournaments removed a number of financial barriers that posed limited practices, such as traveling cost and even hotel costs. With debates being more accessible online and at home, participation widened significantly and debating became more inclusive. This shift did not only increase participation but programs that could not afford to attend tournaments were now given the opportunity to access it online.

Websites such as debatewise.org, debateart.com, and versytalks.com are known as online debate platforms. Rulesets on various sites usually serve to enforce or create a good culture with the site's owner, or in some more open communities, the community itself. Managing post content, style, and access combined with frequent use of "reward" systems (such as reputation, titles, and forum permissions) to promote activities seen as productive while discouraging unwelcome actions. Those cultures vary sufficiently that most styles can find a forum. Some online debate communities and forums practice Policy Debate through uploaded speeches and preset word counts to represent time limits present in the offline debate. Those online debates typically feature long periods of theoretical prep time, as well as the ability to research during a round or to step away from attending online. Meanwhile educational research has shown that debating used as a learning tool has expanded beyond the traditional in person formats and online debating is now common. Different forms of debating, whether live or online, individual or team based have been assessed as a learning tool in this scholarly work. Debating also seems to stimulate interest and may enhance presentation, research and critical thinking skills, suggesting that debating promotes a deeper way of learning than traditional lectures.

Some online debate platforms even offer competitions with cash prizes. Popular ones are the debater of the month or more formal debate formats such as Lincoln-Doublas.

=== Debate shows ===
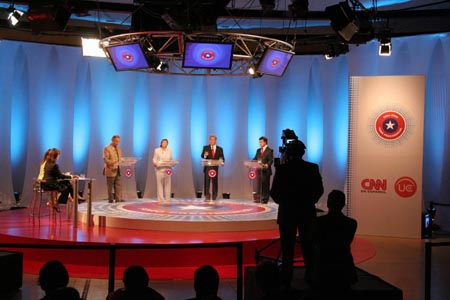
A televised debate held during the 2005 Chilean presidential elections

Debates have also been made into a television show genre.

== See also ==
- Dialectic
- Disputation
- Eloquence
- Persuasion
- Rhetoric
- Category: Debates

International high-school debating

- Heart of Europe Debating Tournament
- World Individual Debating and Public Speaking Championships
- World Schools Debating Championships
- National High School Debate League of China

International University debating

- Debate camp#Popular camps/institutes
- Australasian Intervarsity Debating Championships
- American Parliamentary Debate Association
- Canadian University Society for Intercollegiate Debate
- International Public Debate Association
- National Association of Urban Debate Leagues
- North American Debating Championship
- North American Public Speaking Championship
- World Universities Debating Championship
- World Universities Debating Championship in Spanish
- Peruvian Debate Society
