= University of Queensland Debating Society =

- Abbreviation: UQDS or Queensland
- Formation: MCMLX (1960)
- Type: University Debating
- Headquarters: Room E215 (Rod Laver Arena), Forgan Smith Building, University of Queensland, St Lucia Campus
- Members: 250 approx.
- Official language: English
- Affiliations: University of Queensland Union
- Website: Official Website; Official Facebook Group

The University of Queensland Debating Society (UQDS) is the debating society of the University of Queensland. It has been recognised as one of the oldest and most active student societies at the University of Queensland and one of the most active and successful university debating societies in the world. The UQ Debating Society was also a founding member of the University of Queensland Union.

== History ==
The University of Queensland Debating Society was officially established in 1960; however debating has been present at the University of Queensland since its formation in 1909.

In 1932, the UQ Intervarsity Debating Society organised in Brisbane the first ever national intervarsity debating tournament with all six Australian universities at the time (Melbourne, Tasmania, Sydney, Adelaide, Western Australia, and Queensland).

As was described in the UQ student publication, Semper Floreat, in 1937, "the Society offers a unique opportunity to undergraduates to express themselves on all sorts of heterogeneous topics, to deliver their pet heresies and to slander their friends in a comparatively sheltered academic atmosphere... So don't forget to roll along to the first debate with all your pet theories and subjects. If you have never spoken before you are like most of us—but don't leave it too late to begin. The sooner you start the sooner you reach perfection.'"

In 1953, the UQ Intervarsity Debating Society won the Philippines Cup at the Australian Intervarsity Debating Championships.

== Membership ==
UQDS is made up of approximately 200 members and is open to all students and staff of the University of Queensland. This membership is drawn primarily from undergraduate students at the University of Queensland St Lucia campus, across the academic faculties from biomedical science to anthropology and from commerce to engineering, although the common degrees of the membership tend to be in law, economics, and politics. Graduate students are also members and staff members have been known to participate in the internal debating competition.

There is also a base of frequent attendants in the internal competition from Griffith University and the Queensland University of Technology. On occasion, senior Brisbane high school teams have been invited to participate too.

== Affiliation ==
UQDS is affiliated with the University of Queensland Union and receives support from the University of Queensland Faculty of Business, Economics and Law. The UQDS also has strong ties with the Queensland Debating Union and also the University of Queensland Law Society.

The UQDS is a constituent and voting member of the Australasian Intervarsity Debating Association and the World Universities Debating Council.

== Ranking ==
As of August 2012 UQDS is ranked 14th best in the World and 5th best in Australia, on 17008 points.

As of 2011 UQDS was ranked 6th best in the World, with equal points with Monash University which was 5th, and behind the University of Sydney at first, the University of Oxford, Yale University and University of Cambridge respectively, at the World Universities Debating Championship.

The University of Queensland Debating Society is a strong society in Australia–Asia debating circuit.

== Recent Achievements ==
In 2012 Patrick Begley, Kristen Price and Lauren Humphrey ranked 2nd after preliminary rounds at the Australasian Intervarsity Debating Championships (Australs). Anthony Smith, Sarida McLeod and Alexander O'Hara ranked 6th. Lauren Humphrey was 5th best speaker with Anthony Smith and Kristen Price tied for 6th best speaker.

In 2012 Thomas Ashby, Alexander O'Hara, James Rigby were the runners up of the National Intervarsity Debating Championships (Easters). The team also broke first into the octo-finals without losing a debate. Thomas Ashby was also the Best Speaker.

In 2012 Kristen Price was a judge of the Grand Final of the World Universities Debating Championship (Worlds).

In 2011 Anthony Smith and David Stephens were runners up in the Grand Final of the Australian British Parliamentary Debating Championships (Sydney Mini).

In 2011 Kristen Price and Emily Chalk were the champions of the Australian Women's Parliamentary Debating Championships (Women's).

In 2011 a UQDS team came tenth at the World Universities Peace Invitational Debate (WUPID).

In 2010 Emily Chalk, Lucy Wark and Rebecca Conrick were runners up in the Grand Final of the National Intervarsity Debating Championships (Easters).

In 2008 a UQDS team were the runners up in the Grand Final of the National Intervarsity Debating Championships (Easters).

In 2007 a UQDS team were the runners up in the Grand Final of the World Universities Debating Championship (Worlds)

In 2007 a UQDS team were the champions in the Grand Final of the National Intervarsity Debating Championships (Easters).

In 2007 a UQDS team were the champions in the Grand Final of the Australian Women's Parliamentary Debating Championships (Women's).

In 2007 a UQDS team were the champions in the Grand Final of the Australasian Intervarsity Debating Championships (Australs).

== Activities and Traditions ==
=== First Semester ===
In first semester, UQDS runs a weekly internal competition at the St Lucia Campus in the Australasian Style. This is largely for preparation for the Queensland Universities Debating Championships (Queensland Cup), the National Intervarsity Debating Championships (Easters) and the Australasian Intervarsity Debating Championships (Australs).

=== Second Semester ===
In second semester, the weekly internal competition is in the British Parliamentary Style which is in preparation for World Universities Debating Championship (Worlds).

=== Orientation Week ===
During Market Day UQDS maintains a stall, has a Show Debate and has an introductory barbecue and an O-Week party.

=== Training ===
UQDS also organises regular training sessions, normally before internal competitions and tournaments. Such training consists of matter seminars conducted by members with specialist knowledge, as well as basic and advanced sessions on debating strategy by experienced members.

=== Adjudication Services ===
UQDS provides adjudication for debating competitions of the University of Queensland Intercollege Council and University of Queensland Interfaculty Competitions. Also, the UQDS membership provides a significant amount of adjudicators to the adjudication corps of the Queensland Debating Union, the Queensland Greater Public Schools Debating, and the Brisbane Girls Debating Association (BGDA).

=== Social Events ===
There are also social events, such as the Annual Dinner Ball, tournament send off parties, an annual casual dinner at Sizzler at Toowong Village, competition socials, and weekly dinners at the Pizza Caffe at the Schonell Theatre.

=== The Pineapple Express ===
UQDS publishes The Pineapple Express (formerly The Pig's Head), the debating review and satirical periodical.

=== Schools Day ===
UQDS also run an annual high schools debating competition called the UQDS Schools Day.

=== Show Debates ===
The UQDS performs a number of show debates for different occasions. It regularly often performs show debates for the UQ Faculty of Business, Economics and Law, normally during the start of each semester, as well as for high schools in Queensland.

In August 2012 members performed a show debate for the National Science Week at the Queensland Museum. In October 2012 members performed a show debate for Open Access Week at the Queensland Brain Institute.

== Organisation ==
=== Constitution ===
The UQDS is governed by the Constitution of the University of Queensland Debating Society as well as the Constitution for clubs and societies of the University of Queensland Union. In the UQDS Constitution are the substantive and procedural rules of the Society. Administrative arrangements, such as voting quorum and executive committee portfolios, are also listed.

=== Life Members ===
The UQDS has conferred Honorary Life Membership via Annual General Meetings to Erin O'Brien, Evan Goldman, Kristin Price (2013), James Rigby (2017), Nicholas Salmon (2017), Alex Paterson (2018), Phil Gracen (2018), Tasman Bain (2019), Zachary Thomas (2019), Kelsey Adcock (2021) and Ineka Tabrett (2023).

=== Executive ===
The UQDS is coordinated by an executive committee elected each year at the Annual General Meeting for a term of one year.
