= Chennai Worlds 2014 =

34th World Universities Debating Championship

General Information
- Type: Debate Competition
- Location: Chennai, Tamil Nadu, India.
- Host College: Rajalakshmi Engineering College, Chennai
- Dates: 27 December 2013 – 4 January 2014
- Number of Participating Teams: 372
- Focus: World Universities Debating Championship
- Website: http://chennaiworlds.com/
- Facebook: Chennai Worlds 2014 Official Site
- Twitter: Chennai Worlds 2014 Official Site
- Blog: Chennai Worlds 2014 Official Blog
- You Tube: Chennai Worlds 2014 Official Tube
- Google+: Chennai Worlds 2014 Official Site

Chennai Worlds 2014 (CW14) is the 34th World Universities Debating Championship, hosted and conducted by Rajalakshmi Engineering College, Chennai, Tamil Nadu, India under the aegis of Rajalakshmi Institutions from 27 December 2013 to 4 January 2014.

The World Universities Debating Championship (WUDC) is the world's largest debating tournament, and one of the largest annual international student events. It is a parliamentary debating event held using the British Parliamentary Debate format. Each year, the event is hosted by a university selected by the World Universities Debating Council. The tournament is colloquially referred to as "Worlds" and the winners of the open competition are recognized as the "world champions". The event was ultimately won by a team from Harvard University (Josh Zoffer and Ben Sprung-Keyser), who competed in the Grand Final against teams from the Glasgow University Union, Cambridge University, and the University of Sydney Union. The World Champion 2014 in the category "English as a second language" was Berlin A (Dessislava Kirova and Kai Dittmann) and in the category "English as a foreign language", it was Bandung A (Vicario Reinaldo and Fauzan Reza Maulana).

== Controversies ==
This tournament is notable for several controversies. This included "tracking registration payments, to issues with getting participants visas, allocating hotel rooms, picking participants safely up from the airport, toilet paper disappearing, insufficient food provision, and dangerous dirt bike socials". Discontent among judges who had been offered payment in return for participation resulted in strike threats, jeopardizing the 7th round of the tournament. There were also complaints from Pakistani participants of detention by Indian immigration authorities
