= Square Off =

- Created by: ABS-CBN Corporation
- Developed by: ABS-CBN News and Current Affairs
- Country of origin: Philippines
- Original language: English

Production
- Production locations: Studio 6, ABS-CBN Broadcasting Center, Sgt. Esguerra Avenue, Diliman, Quezon City, Philippines
- Running time: 1 hour

Original release
- Network: ABS-CBN News Channel
- Release: 2006 – March 13, 2020

Square Off is a television debate program broadcast on the ABS-CBN News Channel (ANC). It broadcasts every Friday at 6:00 pm PST, with replays throughout the week. The show is hosted by Maiki Oreta and is primarily sponsored by the Philippine Graphic.

Most participants in Square Off are college-level and law school debaters from various universities around the Philippines debating on important socio-political issues dominating the Philippine landscape. However, some episodes had politicians, civil servants or other influential figures participate in the debates debating on the same issues.

In 2007, as part of its involvement in the World Universities Debating Championship (WUDC), the program recently rebranded itself as Square Off: The Philippine Debate Championship. The winning university participating in the current season will proceed to Assumption University in Bangkok, Thailand, the location of WUDC 2008, to represent the Philippines.

In 2008, "Square Off: The CVC Law Debates" airs Wednesdays at 8 pm and features law school teams - classic arch rivals Ateneo de Manila University and University of the Philippines Diliman. The new season of "Square Off" was sponsored by Villaraza Cruz Marcelo & Angangco (CVC Law). Host Twink Macaraig (Moved to TV5) explained: "The enhanced opportunity for direct challenges or head-to-head confrontations - not only by the opposing teams but the judges, too - guarantees a more dynamic and stimulating experience for participants and spectators alike." Legal luminaries and incumbent trial court judges will serve as adjudicators to boost the "fear factor" element of the competition.

== Format ==
Square Off debates are in modified Policy format, with only two speakers, three-minute constructive speeches, 30-second one-question cross-examination periods, and 1.5-minute rebuttal speeches. However, episodes leading to WUDC 2008 use a modified form of the British Parliamentary format, with only the first four speakers of the opening sides of the house participating, although speeches still remain at the standard seven minutes. Episodes broadcast in the run-up to the Asian Universities Debating Championship used a modified Asian Parliamentary format, with five-minute speeches. Currently, as part of the CVC Law Debates, Square Off uses a modified Policy format with five-minute constructive and 2.5-minute cross-examination speeches.

At the end of each debate, an adjudicator (for Policy format) or a panel of adjudicators (for British Parliamentary format) determine the winning speaker or, in British Parliamentary debates, the best speaker and the winning team. An audience poll conducted via text messaging also determines the "audience's choice" for the winning speaker or best speaker of the debate, although the audience poll does not affect the final result of the debate.

On March 13, 2020, the program is suspended due to the COVID-19 pandemic and eventually cancelled due to the shutdown of ABS-CBN.

== Finals ==
Ateneo de Davao University on October 1, 2008, ousted Saint Louis University, Baguio City in the semi-finals of ABS-CBN's “Square Off: the CVC Law Debates”. The topic was "legalization of euthanasia in the Philippines," with St. Louis for legalization. Adjudicators Atty. Rodel Cruz, Senior Partner of Villaraza Cruz Marcelo & Angangco (CVC Law), and Senate President Franklin Drilon bestowed Ateneo de Davao's Hanniyah Sevilla and Kristine Ferrer, the best speaker, and best texter's choice awards, respectively. Ateneo will face Arellano University in the October 8 finals at ABS-CBN News Channel, 8-9 p.m.

Arellano University Law Forensic Guild debating team was declared the Winner and Champion, taking home Acer laptops and the CD-ROM Lex Libris Law Library Series. Arellano's Rochelle Marie C. Roxas, Luis Warren and Charles Francis Decangchon, opposed the proposition that "term limits of elective officials should be lifted." It impeccably contradicted Ateneo de Davao's 2 main arguments. The partners of Villaraza Cruz Marcelo & Angangco (CVC Law), namely former Philippine Secretary of Defense Avelino "Nonong" Cruz Jr., former Philippine Ombudsman Simeon V. Marcelo, and Senior Partner Raoul R. Angangco, bestowed upon Arellano's Luis Anthony K. Warren, the Judges' and Texters' Choice awards for Best Speaker, winning an LG Viewty cameraphone, a trophy and a 3-day trip for 2 to Boracay. The Best Speaker's scores were tied between Luis Warren and ADDU's Therese Gemelo. CVC Law's Arthur Villaraza announced: "These debates are worth doing again. We will do this again."

== The A.U.D.C. ==
ANC began airing "Square Off: The A.U.D.C.", every Wednesday at 8 p.m. starting October 22, 2008. College-level teams-champion student debaters struggle to be chosen representatives of their school and the Philippines in the 2009 Asian Universities Debating Championship (AUDC) in Bangladesh.

"Square Off: The A.U.D.C." follows the Asian Parliamentary Debate format: the House will consist of government and opposition teams of 3 members each, with 3 judges choosing the best speaker based on matter, manner, and method. AUDC champions, Team Philippines and Team Australia opened the series with Ateneo de Manila University's Sharmila Parmanand, filing a motion for legalization of terrorist suspects. The Australians emerged victorious in the "special exhibition debate" round, on October 22. Chief adjudicator Ashok Rai, adjudicators Logan Balavijendran and Jason Jarvis presided and commended Team Australia's Lucia Pietropaoli who was bestowed the Best Speaker award for the exhibition match.

=== Frank-ahan: The Drilon Debates ===
Franklin Drilon sponsored an all-expense-paid trip to the AUDC, dubbed as "Frank-ahan: The Drilon Debates," with 22 Philippine schools participating. De La Salle University eventually won the Championship beating Ateneo de Manila University. The DLSU team was composed of Dino de Leon, Bianca Lagdameo and Robin Sebolino. The Defeated ADMU team, on the other hand, was composed of Miko Biskocho, Stephanie Co and Gica Mangahas. The Grand Finals was adjudicated by Bar top-notchers Arlene Maneja and Joane de Venecia, Bulacan Councilor Ricky dela Cruz, World Public Speaking Champion Patricia de Venecia, and former Senate President Franklin Drilon.
