= HWS Round Robin =

Debate tournament

- Host: Hobart and William Smith Colleges
- Established: 2007
- Region: International
- Format: British Parliamentary
- Current champion: University of Chicago
- Website: people.hws.edu/barnes/hwsrr/

The HWS Round Robin (HWS RR) is an invitational British Parliamentary (BP) debate tournament hosted annually by the Hobart and William Smith Colleges in Geneva, New York. Participation in the HWS RR is considered prestigious among BP debaters as it is limited to exactly 16 teams that qualify via either an automatic bid given to the champions of major debate tournaments that happen throughout the year, or a competitive application to the tournament's selections committee, with auto-bid teams given priority.

Unlike most parliamentary debate tournaments, such as the World Universities Debating Championship, which use power-pairing to determine preliminary round matches, the HWS RR uses round-robin scheduling to determine team pairings for each of its five preliminary rounds, before advancing the top four teams to the final. The tournament is also notable for its use of dual judging panels, in contrast to the established practice of allocating just one panel of judges per room.

== History ==
The HWS RR was started in 2007 by the HWS Debate Team, with the intent of designing an annual tournament of champions for BP debate. While the World Universities Debating Championship (WUDC) had already long been established at the time, its open nature meant allowing a significant variation in skill among teams. From 2009 to 2013 the tournament was funded by the Open Society Foundations.

== Selection ==
Each year, invitations are sent to all four teams that make it to the Open Grand Final of the WUDC, as well as to the winning team of each of the following 12 major tournaments:

- European Universities Debating Championship
- US Universities Debating Championship
- North American Universities Debating Championship
- Asian British Parliamentary Debating Championship
- United Asian Debating Championship
- Pan African Universities Debating Championship
- Australian British Parliamentary Debating Championships (replaced Sydney Mini from September 2023 onwards)
- Oxford Intervarsity
- Hart House Intervarsity
- Yale Intervarsity
- Cambridge Intervarsity
- Cambridge Women's

This means an automatic bid goes to a total of 16 teams, the exact number required for a five-round round robin BP tournament to work. If a team qualifies for more than one auto-bid (by winning more than one of the tournaments listed) or decides not to attend the tournament, then any extra slot is opened up for an at-large bid, where teams that apply are selected based on their achievements in debating.

== Structure ==
The HWS RR is conducted in the British Parliamentary format, the same one used by the WUDC. In BP, there are four teams, of two debaters each, that compete in a single round.

At the end of the round a panel of judges deliberates and ranks each team from first to fourth, with the first-placer receiving the full 3 points and the last-placer receiving no point. Uniquely, the HWS RR uses two panels, which means the maximum number of points a team can theoretically win in a single round is 6 points. Dual rooms began to see use in 2016 as part of research on the reliability of judge decisions.

The tournament has five preliminary rounds and one final round. During the preliminaries, teams are matched in such a way that they are never in the same room as a team they have faced before. The four teams that accrue the most number of points by the end of the fifth round are advanced to the final round. The winners and runners-up of the final are considered winners and runners-up of the HWS RR for that year.

== Past Tournaments ==
Year	Winners	Runners-up	Finalists	Best Speaker	Topic of Final
2026	Chicago (Helen Wu & Bowser Liu)	Ottawa (Jaleelah Ammar & Jacob Silcoff)	Harvard (Stephanie Chen & Maria Xu), Oxford (Maximus Papaioannides & Leo Marinopoulos)	Maximus Papaioannides	"This house believes that depictions of Satan as tragic are more socially valuable than depictions of him as purely evil."
2025	Manchester (Lucie Slamova & Wajeeh Maaz)	Princeton (Jacquelynn Lin & Xiao-ke Lu)	Oxford (Tajei Puthucheary & Chris Mentis Cravaris), Cambridge (Sophie Hannigan & Max Rosen)	Max Rosen	"Assuming a peaceful and democratic transition, this house supports the United States of America being separated into several, more politically-homogeneous, sovereign states."
2024	Cambridge/Stanford (Ashish Kumar & Tejas Subramaniam)	Chicago/Sydney (Aditya Dhar & Ellie Stephenson)	McGill (Max Rosen & Reana Yan), Chicago/Princeton (Devesh Kodnani & Xiao-ke Lu)	Tejas Subramaniam (by tie-break over Max Rosen)	"This House, as the chemist, would take the chemical weapons job." (Note: The infoslide for this motion reads: "In 1973, philosopher Bernard Williams presents the following example. Kelly is an unemployed chemist who is offered a job developing a new category of chemical weapons (seemingly not prohibited by treaty). Kelly has always been strongly opposed to weapons of mass destruction, but jobs are scarce and Kelly has a family to provide for. Kelly’s spouse makes a very modest salary as a preschool teacher, and has no qualms about Kelly working on these new weapons. If Kelly does not take the job, they are told that someone else without any reservations about the weapons research will take the job and will likely move the development ahead more quickly.")
2023	Stanford (Tejas Subramaniam & Arthur Lee)	LSE (Matt Caito & Ahmed Elsammak)	Princeton (Jane Mentzinger & Greg Weaving), Princeton (Xiao-ke Lu & Isaac Cape)	Tejas Subramaniam	"This House believes that feminist movements in developing nations should prioritize the strategy of advocating for carceral feminism."
2022	McGill (Naomi Panovka & Max Rosen)	Oxford (Rachel O'Nunain & Oskar Sherry)	Harvard (Hamza Chaudhry & Aditya Dhar), Princeton (Xiao-ke Lu & Greg Weaving)	Hamza Chaudhry	"This House supports increased military spending and rearmament plans announced by Germany and other EU countries."
2021	Zagreb (Tin Puljić & Lovro Šprem)	LSE (Abhinav Bathula & Trenton Sewell)	Ateneo (David Africa & Luigi Alcaneses), Harvard (Aditya Dhar & Asher Spector)	Abhinav Bathula	"This House believes that the legacy of historical figures should not suffer due to those figures' immoral actions, if those actions were generally seen as morally unproblematic by their own society."
2020	Yale (David Edimo & Eva-Marie Quinones)	Cambridge (Lucía Arce & Tudor Musat)	IBA Dhaka (Sajid Khandaker & Sourodip Paul), Harvard (Aditya Dhar & Michael Nehme)	Lucía Arce	"This House believes that individuals have a moral obligation to not have biological children."
2019	Oxford (Kit Mercer & Jason Xiao)	Melbourne (Stuart Dixon & Connor O'Brien)	Harvard (Danny DeBois & Mars He), Harvard (John Hunt & Michael Nehme)	Danny DeBois	"This House believes that the Black Lives Matter movement should embrace open carry gun laws and engage in armed community patrols."
2018	Cambridge (Alasdair Donovan & Ian Wu)	Oxford (Jason Xiao & Lee Chin Wee)	Stanford (Harry Elliott & Bobbi Leet), Tel Aviv (Noam Dahan & Tom Manor)	Lee Chin Wee	"This House believes that the interests of the Chinese people would be better served by a peaceful transition into a democracy, rather than a continuation of the one-party rule."
2017	Tel Aviv (Dan Lahav & Sella Nevo)	Harvard (Danny DeBois & Archie Hall)	Cornell (Enting Lee & Adrian Muttalib), Yale (Evan Lynyak, Henry Zhang)	Danny DeBois	"This House believes that governments should abandon the strategy of decapitation in fighting terrorism."
2016	Cambridge (Ashish Kumar & Michael Dunn-Goekjian)	Tel Aviv (Ayal Hayut-Man & Dan Lahav)	Cambridge (George Clay & Etsuko Lim), Yale (Tony Nguyen, Henry Zhang)	Michael Dunn-Goekjian	"This House supports health insurance companies offering optional lump sum payments to terminally ill patients who choose to forgo expensive life extending medical treatments."
2015	Hart House (Joe McGrade & Veenu Goswami)	Cambridge (Ashish Kumar & Michael Dunn-Goekjian)	Harvard (Bo Seo & Fanele Mashwama), Hart House (Lex Sundarsingh, Aislin Flynn)	Michael Dunn-Goekjian	"This House believes that prominent civil society activists should choose not to run for elected office."
2014	Sydney (Chris Bisset & Daniel Swain)	Yale (Zach Bakal & Nick Cugini)	Cambridge (Ashish Kumar & Kitty Parker-Brooks), Cambridge (Michael Dunn-Goekjian, Freddy Powell)	Daniel Swain	"This House believes that, within broad budgetary constraints, environmental policy should be decided by unelected scientific experts selected by their peers."
2013	Lincoln's Inn (James Hardy & Harish Natarajan)	Cornell (Alex Bores & Danny Blackman)	Loyola Marymount (James Kilcup & James Molison), Yale (Sam Ward-Packard & Andrew Connery)	Harish Natarajan	"This House would use diversity quotas for university admissions."
2012	Stanford (Michael Baer & Shengwu Li)	Oxford (Will Jones & Ben Woolgar)	Sydney (Dominic Bowes & Paul Karp), Yale (Nick Cugini & Ben Kornfeld)	Ben Woolgar	"This House believes that the government should subsidise newspapers."
2011	Stanford (Alexander Campbell & Anish Mitra)	Oxford (Stephanie Bell & Ben Woolgar)	Hart House (Veenu Goswami & Steve Penner), MIT (Adam Goldstein & Peter McKee)	Ben Woolgar	"This House believes that whenever individuals have a choice between spending money on luxuries or donating it to ameliorating suffering, morality demands donating."
2010	TCD Hist (Niamh Ni Mhaoileoin & Niall Sherry)	Queen's (Adam Hetherington & Cristine Wadsworth)	Sydney (Bronwyn Cowell & Tim Mooney), Cornell (Ryan Yeh & Alex Bores)	Tim Mooney	"This House would ban parents from genetically selecting children who lack a predisposition to homosexuality."
2009	Oxford (Jonathan Leader Maynard & Alexander Worsnip)	Hart House (Richard Lizius & Ian Freeman)	Loyola Marymount (Kevin Kiley & Alexander Schwab), Middle Temple (Douglas Cochran & Daniel Warents)	Jonathan Leader Maynard	"This House would eliminate executive pardons."
2008	Harvard (Cormac Early & Lewis Bollard)	Claremont (Charlie Sprague & Kari Wohlschlegel)	Hart House (John Ashbourne & Alexander Levy), Oxford (Lewis Turner & Alexander Worsnip)	Lewis Turner	"This House would establish an international force to arrest those indicted by the International Criminal Court."
2007	Yale (Adam Chilton & David Denton)	Harvard (Cormac Early & Allen Ewalt)	Harvard (Lewis Bollard & Rezwan Haque), McGill (Leon Grek & Susannah Patton)	Adam Chilton	"This House supports requiring community service for graduation from high school."

== See also ==
- World Universities Debating Championship
- North American Debating Championship
- Australasian Intervarsity Debating Championships
- United Asian Debating Championships
- Pan African Universities Debating Championship
