= Australasian Intervarsity Debating Championships =

Annual collegiate debating tournament

The Australasian Intervarsity Debating Championships (known colloquially as "Australs") is an annual debating tournament for teams from universities in the Australasian region. It is one of the world's largest debating tournaments, second only in size to the World Universities Debating Championship (WUDC), the European Universities Debating Championships (EUDC) and one of the largest annual student events in the world. Australs follows the Australia-Asian Debating format (three speakers plus replies), rather than the British Parliamentary Style used at WUDC. It is held every year in early-July under the auspices of the Australasian Intervarsity Debating Association (AIDA). The host university is selected a year before at a meeting of the Council of the Australasian Intervarsity Debating Association.

The best speaker of the tournament is awarded the "Martin Sorensen Trophy", and the best speaker of the Grand Final is awarded the "Jock Fanselow Cup".

The most recent edition of Australs was held by The University of Wollongong. The tournament was hosted in Australia. The current champions are Oliver Bardsley, Maya Anderson, and Jehiel Pather of the University of New South Wales.

== History ==
Since the inaugural tournament at the University of Sydney in 1975, Australs has continually expanded the scope of its participants, now attracting around 300 competitors each year from around the Asia-Pacific region. Australs was significantly modernised in 1993 when a new constitution was introduced by then AIDA President. The Constitution provided for standard rules of debate and adjudication, and provided for extended voting rights for non-Australian and New Zealand participants. Currently teams come from Australia, Bangladesh, China, Hong Kong, India, Indonesia, Japan, Malaysia, New Zealand, Pakistan, Singapore, South Korea, Thailand, Russia and the Philippines.

Prior to the inception of the AIDA in 1990, there were occasional problems with the administration and rule-format for Australs, as the running of the tournament was left to the host university, with a meeting of all Universities at the end of the competition. There was little ongoing supervision of the hosts, and adjudication standards varied widely.

== Gender and Diversity ==
In 1992 an affirmative action requirement was introduced to ensure that at least one third of each University's contingent must be female, unless the circumstances could be justified. This was prompted by the poor representation of female debaters at Australs. In 1990 only 8% of all speakers eligible to make the finals at Australasian championships were female, although women were over-represented as adjudicators. In 1991, the year before the introduction of the affirmative action requirement, the first women's meeting was held to discuss ways to combat the problem. At that time the participation rate had risen to 21%, with the introduction of a number of universities as first-time participants. Few women were represented in the finals, however. The intention behind the introduction of the rule was that it would encourage universities to promote debating to a large number of potential members and train their debaters before they attended Australs. It was also thought that this would encourage a greater diversity of speaking styles, rather than what was seen as a very aggressive style by a number of very successful and talented Australian male debaters, and this would benefit all debaters and universities.

== Past champions and hosts ==
Year	Champions	Runners-up	Hosts
2026	University of New South Wales (Australia)	Indira Gandhi National Open University (India)	University of Wollongong (Australia)
2025	National University of Singapore (Singapore)	Australian National University (Australia)	Edudrift (China)
2024	University of Sydney (Australia)	University of Sydney (Australia)	Multimedia Nusantara University (Indonesia)
2023	University of Sydney (Australia)	National University of Singapore (Singapore)	Chulalongkorn University (Thailand)
2022	University of Sydney (Australia)	University of the Philippines Diliman (Philippines)	Western Sydney University (Australia)
2021	Ateneo de Manila University (Philippines)	Macquarie University (Australia)	Held online by National Speech and Debate Association (Nepal) and Debate Network Nepal due to the COVID-19 pandemic
2020	Australian National University (Australia)	University of Sydney (Australia)	Held online by Monash University (Australia) due to the COVID-19 pandemic
2019	University of Melbourne (Australia)	Australian National University (Australia)	National University of Singapore (Singapore)
2018	Macquarie University (Australia)	University of Sydney (Australia)	University of Malaya (Malaysia)
2017	Australian National University (Australia)	University of Sydney (Australia)	University of Queensland Debating Society (Australia)
2016	International Islamic University Malaysia (Malaysia)	University of Sydney (Australia)	University of Western Australia (Australia)
2015	University of Sydney (Australia)	University of Auckland (New Zealand)	SolBridge International School of Business (South Korea)
2014	Victoria University of Wellington (New Zealand)	University of Sydney (Australia)	University of Otago (New Zealand)
2013	University of Sydney (Australia)	Victoria University of Wellington (New Zealand)	Universiti Teknologi MARA (Malaysia)
2012	Monash University (Australia)	Monash University (Australia)	Victoria University of Wellington (New Zealand)
2011	Victoria University of Wellington (New Zealand)	National University of Singapore (Singapore)	Chung-Ang University (South Korea)
2010	Victoria University of Wellington (New Zealand)	University of Auckland (New Zealand)	University of Auckland (New Zealand)
2009	Monash University (Australia)	Victoria University of Wellington (New Zealand)	Monash University (Australia)
2008	University of Sydney (Australia)	Monash University (Australia)	Ateneo de Manila University (Philippines)
2007	University of Queensland Debating Society (Australia)	Victoria University of Wellington (New Zealand)	Universiti Teknologi Mara (Malaysia)
2006	Monash University (Australia)	University of Melbourne (Australia)	Victoria University of Wellington (New Zealand)
2005	University of Sydney (Australia)	Ateneo de Manila University (Philippines)	University of Queensland Debating Society (Australia)
2004	Monash University (Australia)	Multimedia University (Malaysia)	University of Technology, Sydney (Australia)
2003	University of Sydney (Australia)	Monash University (Australia)	Multimedia University (Malaysia)
2002	University of Melbourne (Australia)	Australian National University (Australia)	University of Melbourne (Australia)
2001	Monash University (Australia)	University of Melbourne (Australia)	Nanyang Technological University (Singapore)
2000	Monash University (Australia)	University of Sydney (Australia)	Monash University (Australia)
1999	University of Sydney (Australia)	Monash University (Australia)	Victoria University of Wellington (New Zealand)
1998	Victoria University of Wellington (New Zealand)	University of Sydney (Australia)	University of Sydney (Australia)
1997	University of Sydney (Australia)	Monash University (Australia)	De La Salle University-Manila (Philippines)
1996	Monash University (Australia)	University of Sydney (Australia)	Australian National University (Australia)
1995	University of Sydney (Australia)	Monash University (Australia)	Monash University (Australia)
1994	Macquarie University (Australia)	University of Technology, Sydney (Australia)	University of Tasmania (Australia)
1993	Monash University (Australia)	University of Melbourne (Australia)	International Islamic University (Malaysia)
1992	Monash University (Australia)		University of Sydney (Australia)
1991	Australian National University (Australia)	Monash University (Australia)	University of Melbourne (Australia)
1990	University of Sydney (Australia)	Australian National University (Australia)	University of Adelaide (Australia)
1989	Australian National University (Australia)		Australian National University (Australia)
1988	University of Sydney (Australia)	University of Melbourne (Australia)	National University of Singapore (Singapore)
1987	University of Sydney (Australia)	University of Otago (New Zealand)	Victoria University of Wellington (New Zealand)
1986	University of Sydney (Australia)	University of Melbourne (Australia)	University of Melbourne (Australia)
1985	University of Sydney (Australia)	University of Otago (New Zealand)	University of Auckland (New Zealand)
1984	University of New South Wales (Australia)		University of Adelaide (Australia)
1983	University of Adelaide (Australia)		University of Sydney (Australia)
1982	Victoria University of Wellington (New Zealand)		Victoria University of Wellington (New Zealand)
1981	University of Sydney (Australia)		Monash University (Australia)
1980	Victoria University of Wellington (New Zealand)		University of Canterbury (New Zealand)
1979	University of Sydney (Australia)		
1978	University of Sydney (Australia)		
1977			
1976	University of Melbourne (Australia)		
1975	University of Sydney (Australia)		

== Awards and Prizes ==
=== Martin Sorensen Trophy ===
The 'Martin Sorensen Trophy' is awarded to the best speaker of the tournament.

A prize recognising the tournament's best speaker was first awarded in 1989, however in 1994, it was renamed the Martin Sorensen Trophy in honour of the outstanding Monash University debater who died in July 1993 – only days after winning the award for the second time in a row.

Sorensen was considered to be the finest debater of his generation. In addition to being awarded the Best Speaker prize twice, he won the tournament twice, was a runner-up once, and was selected in the Australian Test team 3 years in a row. After his death, it was decided that the Best Speaker award would be named in Sorensen's honour to preserve his memory, and it is common for Australs debaters to be educated about his legacy even now, 20 years after his death.

The Trophy is awarded to the debater with the highest total sum of speaker scores in the preliminary rounds of competition. It is considered to be the most prestigious individual award in Australasian debating.

Year	Name	University
2026	Gypsy Polacheck	Australian National University (Australia)
2025	Cavan Tay	National University of Singapore (Singapore)
2024	Charlie Ryan	University of Sydney (Australia)
2023	Udai Kamath	University of Sydney (Australia)
2022	Udai Kamath; Matthew Toomey; David Africa	Macquarie University (Australia); University of Sydney (Australia); Ateneo De Manila University (Philippines)
2021	Oliver Cummins	University of Sydney (Australia)
2020	Sourodip Paul; Ploopy	Australian National University (Australia); Taylors University (Malaysia)
2019	Connor O'Brien	University of Melbourne (Australia)
2018	Imogen Harper	University of Sydney (Australia)
2017	Imogen Harper; Dominic Guinane	University of Sydney (Australia); Australian National University (Australia)
2016	Emma Johnstone	University of Sydney (Australia)
2015	Tyrone Connell	University of Melbourne (Australia)
2014	Asher Emanuel	Victoria University of Wellington (New Zealand)
2013	Daniel Swain	University of Sydney (Australia)
2012	Chris Bisset	Monash University (Australia)
2010	Victor Finkel	Monash University (Australia)
2009	Amit Golder	Monash University (Australia)
2008	Naomi Oreb	University of Sydney (Australia)
2007	Sayeqa Islam	Victoria University of Wellington (New Zealand)
2006	Elizabeth Sheargold	University of Melbourne (Australia)
2005	Ivan Ah Sam	University of Sydney (Australia)
2004	Mathew Kenneally	Australian National University (Australia)
2003	Tim Sonnreich	Monash University (Australia)
2002	Tim Sonnreich	Monash University (Australia)
2001	Steve Bell	University of Melbourne (Australia)
2000	Kim Little	Monash University (Australia)
1999	Dan Celm	Monash University (Australia)
1998	Praba Ganesan	De La Salle University-Manila (Philippines)
1996	Lizzie Knight; Phillip Senior	Monash University (Australia); University of Western Australia (Australia)
1995	Christian Porter; Matthew Richardson	University of Western Australia (Australia); University of New South Wales (Australia)
1994	Tony Burke	University of Sydney (Australia)
1993	Martin Sorensen	Monash University (Australia)
1992	Martin Sorensen	Monash University (Australia)
1991	Julian Beckedahl; Rufus Black	Monash University (Australia); University of Melbourne (Australia)
1990	Camilla Newcombe	Australian National University (Australia)
1989	Richard Douglas	Australian National University (Australia)

=== Jock Fanselow Cup ===
The best speaker in the Grand Final is awarded the 'Jock Fanselow Cup.'

Jock Fanselow was a debating legend in New Zealand and Australasia. Representing Victoria University, he won Australs in 1980, and 1982 – the first person to win Australs twice. He was best speaker in the Grand Final of both years. Unfortunately, ill health plagued Jock since birth and a suppressed immune system saw him contract a virus which led to his death in January 2006 at the age of 48. Jock's debating teammates, friends, and family donated a cup in his name and it was first presented at Australs 2006, held at Jock's home university, Victoria University of Wellington.

Year	Name	University
2026	Oliver Bardsley	University of New South Wales (Australia)
2025	Cavan Tay	National University of Singapore (Singapore)
2024	Sophie Shead	University of Sydney (Australia)
2023	Charlie Ryan	University of Sydney (Australia)
2022	Sam Trotter	University of Sydney (Australia)
2021	Toby Leung	Ateneo de Manila University (Philippines)
2020	Amrit Agastia	Australian National University (Australia)
2019	Connor O'Brien	University of Melbourne (Australia)
2018	Georgia Chahoud	Macquarie University (Australia)
2017	Callum Dargavel	Australian National University (Australia)
2016	Ameera Natasha Moore	International Islamic University (Malaysia)
2015	Evie Woodforde	University of Sydney (Australia)
2014	Nicholas Cross	Victoria University of Wellington (New Zealand)
2013	Daniel Swain	University of Sydney (Australia)
2012	Kiran Iyer	Monash University (Australia)
2011	Udayan Mukherjee	Victoria University of Wellington (New Zealand)
2010	Stephen Whittington	Victoria University of Wellington (New Zealand)
2009	Amit Golder	Monash University (Australia)
2008	Naomi Oreb	University of Sydney (Australia)
2007	Sayeqa Islam	Victoria University of Wellington (New Zealand)
2006	Roland Dillon	Monash University (Australia)

=== Boby Andika Ruitang Memorial Trophy ===
The best ESL speaker of the tournament is awarded the 'Boby Andika Ruitang Memorial Trophy'.

The trophy was introduced after Boby's passing in 2021 to commemorate their exceptional contribution to debate in Asia and support of ESL speakers in global debating.

Year	Name	University
2026	Yang Ming Sim	University of New South Wales (Australia)
2025	Ricky Jin	Peking University (China)
2024	Annika Wang	University of Sydney (Australia)
2023	Ahsan Kuhan Karttikeyn	University of Malaya (Malaysia)
2022	Bea Legaspi	University of the Philippines Diliman (Philippines)
2021	Sajid Khandaker	BRAC University (Bangladesh)
2020	Ploopy Sourodip Paul	Taylor's University (Malaysia) Australian National University (Australia)
2019	Sajid Khandaker	
2018		
2017	Syarif Fakhri	International Islamic University Malaysia (Malaysia)
2016	Mubarret Wassey	International Islamic University Malaysia (Malaysia)
2015		
2014		
2013		
2012		
2011		
2010		
2009	Tirza Reinata	University of Indonesia (Indonesia)
2008		
2007	Astrid Kusumawardhani	University of Indonesia (Indonesia)

=== Best EFL speaker ===
Year	Name	University
2026	Yuhyeok Han	Yonsei University (South Korea)
2025	Ricky Jin	Peking University (China)
2024	Annika Wang	University of Sydney (Australia)
2023	Sunghyun Park	Seoul National University (South Korea)
2022	Brian Hose Antonio Hambur	Universitas Gadjah Mada (Indonesia)
2021	Kanan Ishizaka	University of Tokyo (Japan)
2020	Atsushi Sumida	Keio University (Japan)
2019	Kanan Ishizaka	University of Tokyo (Japan)
2018		
2017	Derril Pramana Tungka	University of Indonesia (Indonesia)

=== Best reply speaker ===
Year	Best reply speaker	University
2026	Harry Rae	University of Queensland (Australia)
2025	Justin Tay	National University of Singapore (Singapore)
2024	Sophie Shead	University of Sydney (Australia)
2023	Daniel Yim	University of Sydney (Australia)
2022	David Africa	Ateneo de Manila University (Philippines)
2021	Umbar Sandhu	University of Auckland (New Zealand)
2020	Amrit Agastia; Ignacio Villareal	Australian National University (Australia) Ateneo de Manila University (Philippines)
2019	Kevin Lee	University of Sydney (Australia)
2018	James Stratton	University of Sydney (Australia)
2017	James Stratton	University of Sydney (Australia
2016	Emma Johnstone	University of Sydney (Australia)
2015	Edward Miller	University of Sydney (Australia)
2014	Asher Emanuel	Victoria University of Wellington (New Zealand)
2013	Asher Emanuel	Victoria University of Wellington (New Zealand)
2012	Elle Jones	University of Sydney (Australia)
2011	Elle Jones	University of Sydney (Australia)

== See also ==
- World Universities Debating Championship
- North American Debating Championship
- United Asian Debating Championships
