= World Universities Debating Championship =

International student tournament

- Logo of the 2023 Madrid Worlds.
- Established: 1980, by the GUU
- Region: International
- Format: British Parliamentary
- Current champion: (Australia) University of Sydney
- Website: worlddebating.org

The World Universities Debating Championship (WUDC) is the world's largest international debating tournament and one of the largest annual international student events. WUDC is held in the British Parliamentary format (involving four teams of two people in each debate).

Each year, the event is hosted by an institution selected by the World Universities Debating Council. The current 2026 world champions are Udai Kamath and Jack Story from the University of Sydney.

== History ==
=== Predecessor tournaments ===
The Trans-Atlantic University Speech Association held tournaments in London (1976 and 1978) and at McGill University, Montreal, in 1977. Chicago was to hold a tournament in 1979 but this was postponed and then abandoned. A "World Debating Festival", sponsored by Honeywell was held in Sydney in 1978. The TAUSA event attracted mostly Northern Hemisphere tournaments, the Honeywell was largely Southern Hemisphere. The first competition was hosted in Glasgow and convened by debaters at the Glasgow University Union.

== Format ==
The championship is usually held in the days following the 25th of December, since many of the institutions attending from the Northern Hemisphere where the championship originated take vacations at this time. Although many countries that do not celebrate Christmas have become participants at the competition, the timing has remained the same. In most recent years, the nine preliminary rounds of the tournament have been held over three days from 29 to 31 December, with the elimination rounds being held on 2 January and the Grand Final on 3 January.

In recent years, the championship has varied from about 150 to 400 teams, depending on the capacity of the host institution. With judges and organisers, this involves 500 to 1,000 participants in all.

The competition involves nine preliminary rounds, which become "power-paired" as the tournament progresses, matching the strongest-performing teams against each other. Two teams form the "government" ("proposition" in the UK and North America) and two the "opposition" in each debate room. The process of scoring and pairing these teams is known as "tabbing". The scoring of teams is done by judges, most of whom are students or former students from the competing institutions, who return "ballots" with their scores to the adjudication team, led by a Chief Adjudicator who is assisted by one or more deputies. The deputies are not members of the host institution.

The nine preliminary rounds are followed by a "break" at which the teams proceeding to elimination rounds are announced. This is traditionally done on New Year's Eve, although this is subject to the timing of the tournament. In the current tournament format, the top 16 teams from the preliminary rounds proceed to the octofinal round. The teams ranked 17–48 also break into a partial double octofinal round, and the winning teams from this round join the teams ranked 1–16 in the octo-finals. While preliminary rounds are usually judged by three to five judges, the break rounds are judged by panels of five, semifinal judged by panels of seven and the finals by panels of nine.

Separate breaks are announced for the English-as-a-second language (ESL) and English-as-a-foreign language (EFL) team competitions, for the individual public speaking competition, and the "World Masters" tournament which is participated in by judges (most of whom are no longer students) representing the countries where they studied or of which they are citizens. In addition, a comedy competition is also open to all participants in Worlds.

== Governance ==
The World Universities Debating Council consists of representatives of every country that competes at the World Universities Debating Championship. Each country selects one council delegate (the national debating association president, or selected from the participants at Worlds). The council is responsible for setting the rules and awarding the right to host the championships.

A Worlds Committee is elected to discuss issues during the year as Council only meets at the championships itself. This Committee consists of a mix of elected officers and regional representatives from Africa, the Americas, Australia and New Zealand, Continental Europe and the Middle East, and the British Isles (referred to in debating as Islands of the North Atlantic thought more politically acceptable than British Isles).

The Council formerly operated not unlike the United Nations Security Council, with seven nations holding "charter member status" – the United States, Canada, England, Scotland, Ireland, Australia and New Zealand. A two-thirds majority of these countries was required for changes to the championship's constitution, irrespective of how the general vote was tallied. However, as the number of non-charter nations attending grew, many fielding far more teams than some of the upper tier, and the championship began being hosted outside the Charter nations, pressure grew for the distinction to be eliminated.

The modern championship grants voting strength of between one and four votes per country, based on numbers of institutions attending recent championships. To allow for fluctuations in participation due to the financial difference in attending championships nearer or further in succeeding years, nations lose or gain their voting strength gradually.

The current chair of the council and the committee is Martha McKinney-Perry from the University of Cambridge.

== Notable controversies ==
=== Thailand WUDC 2020 ===
There was concern over the public debate of Hong Kong in the Open Grand Final motion. This led to walk-outs during the debate, including 30 Chinese students and teachers. After the live-stream, all recordings of the debate were deleted, but the motion was still present on the tabulation software. Many participants had names removed from the public record retroactively once the competition was over. The organizing committee claims this was done to respect participants' privacy and denies pressure from any national body or representative.

=== Cape Town WUDC 2019 ===
Accusations of racism were made against members of the organising committee over treatment of participants. On the last day of the competition and just before the Open Grand Final was to begin, an organised protest took place and disrupted the event. Rather than delay the Open Grand Final, speakers and judges were relocated to an undisclosed room and the debate took place in private. This action was the subject of further controversy due to perceived undermining of an anti-racist cause.

=== Chennai WUDC 2014 ===
This tournament is notable for several controversies. This included "tracking registration payments, to issues with getting participants visas, allocating hotel rooms, picking participants safely up from the airport, toilet paper disappearing, insufficient food provision, and dangerous dirt bike socials". Discontent among judges who had been offered payment in return for participation resulted in strike threats, jeopardizing the 7th round of the tournament. There were also complaints from Pakistani participants of detention by Indian immigration authorities.

== List of tournaments ==
Year	Host city	Hosting institution	Winning institution	Winning open team	Open finalists	Best speaker	Topic of Open Grand Final
2028	Pretoria, South Africa	Gauteng Debate, University of Pretoria Debating Union & Think Uhuru					
2027	Ottawa, Canada	English Debating Society at UOttawa					
2026	Sofia, Bulgaria	Bulgarian Debate Association	University of Sydney	Udai Kamath & Jack Story	Stanford University A, Sofia University A, Cambridge University A	Bharath Anantham, University of Oxford	This House opposes the development of AI systems to optimise for human influence.
2025	Panama City, Panama	Asociación Panameña de Debate	Dartmouth College	Madeleine Wu & Ryan Lafferty	Bates College A, University of Sydney B, Oxford C	Matthew Toomey, University of Sydney	This House supports the shift away from the left-right spectrum in the politics of major democracies.
2024	Ho Chi Minh City, Vietnam	FPT University & RMIT University	University of Oxford	Mark Rothery & Aniket Chakravorty	Stanford University A, University of Belgrade A, University of Sydney B	Tejas Subramaniam, Stanford University	This House opposes the norm to prefer the natural to the artificial.
2023	Madrid, Spain	Universidad Rey Juan Carlos & Universidad Autónoma de Madrid	Ateneo de Manila University	David Africa & Tobi Leung	Princeton University B, Tel Aviv University A, Sofia University A	Hadar Goldberg, Tel Aviv University	This House prefers a world where all individuals have a strong belief in Ubuntu.
2022	(Serbia) Virtual due to COVID-19	University of Belgrade	BRAC University	Sajid Asbat Khandaker & Sourodip Paul	Ateneo De Manila University A, Princeton University B, National University of Singapore A	Matt Caito, London School of Economics	This House supports a decline in global reliance on the dollar.
2021	(South Korea) Virtual due to COVID-19	Debate Korea	University of Zagreb	Tin Puljić & Lovro Šprem	Ateneo De Manila University 1, London School of Economics B, Ateneo De Manila University 2	Tin Puljić, University of Zagreb	This House supports the creation of an international court with a mandate to prosecute leaders for health crimes.
2020	Bangkok, Thailand	Assumption University	University of Oxford	Jason Xiao & Lee Chin Wee	University of Belgrade A, Macquarie University B, Yale University A	Lee Chin Wee, University of Oxford	This House, as China, would grant universal suffrage to Hong Kong.
2019	Cape Town, South Africa	University of Cape Town	University of Sydney	Bostan Nurlanov & Kevin Lee	Cornell University B, University of Sydney A, University of Zagreb A	James Stratton, University of Sydney	This House believes that the present condition of humanity is preferable to its condition in 100 years time.
2018	Mexico City, Mexico	Asociación Mexicana de Debate	Harvard University	Danny DeBois & Archie Hall	Princeton University A, Stanford University A, University of Sydney C	Dan Lahav, Tel Aviv University	This House would rather save the life of a single child, over extending the life of 5 adults by 10 years.
2017	The Hague, Netherlands	Debating Societies of the Netherlands	University of Sydney	Emma Johnstone & James Leeder	Yale University A, Oxford University A, Bates College A	Raffy Marshall, University of Oxford	This House would apply universal jurisdiction to crimes against the environment.
2016	Thessaloniki, Greece	Debating Society of Greece	Harvard University	Bo Seo & Fanele Mashwama	Hart House A, University of Sydney B, Faculty of Business Economics and Entrepreneurship A	Michael Dunn Goekjian, Faculty of Business Economics and Entrepreneurship, Belgrade	This House believes that the world's poor would be justified in pursuing complete Marxist revolution.
2015	Shah Alam, Malaysia	Universiti Teknologi MARA	University of Sydney	Nick Chung & Edward Miller	Oxford University A, BPP University A, Harvard University A	Ashish Kumar, University of Cambridge	This House believes that humanitarian organisations should, and should be allowed to, give funding, resources or services to illegal armed groups when this is made a condition for access to vulnerable civilians.
2014	Chennai, India	Rajalakshmi Engineering College	Harvard University	Josh Zoffer & Ben Sprung-Keyser	University of Sydney B, University of Glasgow A, University of Cambridge B	Eleanor Jones, University of Sydney	This House believes that India should pursue aggressive free market policies.
2013	Berlin, Germany	Berlin Debating Union	Monash University	Nita Rao & James Beavis	University of Otago A, University of Sydney B, University of Auckland A	Chris Bissett, Monash University & Pam Cohn, University of London	This House would not allow religious communities to expel members on the basis of views or actions that contradict doctrinal teachings.
2012	Manila, Philippines	De La Salle	Monash University	Kiran Iyer & Amit Golder	Stanford University A, Oxford University B, University of Sydney B	Ben Woolgar, University of Oxford	This House supports nationalism.
2011	Gaborone, Botswana	University of Botswana	Monash University	Victor Finkel & Fiona Prowse	Oxford University A, University of Sydney A, London School of Economics A	Victor Finkel, Monash University	This House would invade Zimbabwe.
2010	Istanbul, Turkey	Koç University	University of Sydney	Chris Croke & Steve Hind	Harvard University A, London School of Economics A, Oxford University A	Shengwu Li, University of Oxford	This House believes that the media should show the full horror of war.
2009	(Republic of Ireland) Cork, Ireland	University College Cork	University of Oxford	James Dray & Will Jones	Monash University B, Harvard University A, Oxford University C	Naomi Oreb, University of Sydney	This House would ban abortion.
2008	Bangkok, Thailand	Assumption University	University of Oxford	Samir Deger-Sen & Lewis Iwu	Monash University, Cambridge University, University of Sydney	Sam Block, University of Cambridge	THB that people who give HIV to others must pay drug support.
2007	Vancouver, Canada	University of British Columbia	University of Sydney	Julia Bowes & Anna Garsia	University of Queensland A, University of Cambridge C, Oxford University D	Jess Prince, University of Oxford	This House believes that economic growth is the solution to climate change.
2006	(Republic of Ireland) Dublin, Ireland	University College Dublin	Hart House, University of Toronto	Michael Kotrly & Joanna Nairn	Yale University A, Inner Temple, University of Chicago A	Rory Gillis & Beth O'Connor, Yale University	This House would abolish all laws prohibiting cruelty to animals.
2005	Cyberjaya, Malaysia	Multimedia University	University of Ottawa	Erik Eastaugh & Jamie Furniss	University of Cambridge A, Oxford University D, Hart House B	Kylie Lane, Monash University	This House supports corporal punishment in schools.
2004	Singapore	Nanyang Technological University	Middle Temple	Alex Deane & Jeremy Brier	University of Sydney A, Singapore Institute of Management A, Inner Temple	Alex Croft, University of Sydney	This House would ban the abortion of fetuses on the grounds of their permanent disability.
2003	Stellenbosch, South Africa	Stellenbosch University	University of Cambridge	Jack Anderson & Caleb Ward	Monash University B, University of Cambridge A, University of Melbourne A	Wu Meng Tan, University of Cambridge	This House believes that the world has learned nothing from 9/11.
2002	Toronto, Canada	Hart House, University of Toronto	New York University School of Law	Rob Weekes & Alan Merson	University College Dublin, Monash University A, Durham University B	Ewan Smith, University of Oxford	This House Would ban criminals from publishing accounts of their crimes.
2001	Glasgow, Scotland	Glasgow University Union	University of Sydney	Greg O'Mahony & Paul Hunyor	University of London, King's Inns, University of Sydney B	Paul Hunyor, University of Sydney	This House would elect its judges.
2000	Sydney, Australia	University of Sydney	Monash University	Kim Little & Cathy Roussow	University College Dublin, University of Glasgow A, University of La Verne	Andy Kidd, University of Oxford	This House believes Marx would have approved of the internet.
1999	Manila, Philippines	Ateneo de Manila University	Monash University	Meg O’Sullivan & Andrew Phillips	University of Sydney E, University of Oxford, University of Sydney B	Andy Kidd, University of Oxford	This House believes Netanyahu is the biggest obstacle to peace in Israel.
1998	Athens, Greece	Deree College	Gray's Inn	Neil Sheldon & Andy George	Oxford University, University of Edinburgh, University of Western Ontario	Neil Sheldon, Gray's Inn	This House believes that humanitarianism is a first world affectation.
1997	Stellenbosch, South Africa	Stellenbosch University	Glasgow University Union	Andy Hume & Derek Sloan	University of London, Gray's Inn, University of Edinburgh	Andy George, Gray's Inn	This House would legalize all drugs.
1996	(Republic of Ireland) Cork, Ireland	University College Cork	Macquarie University	Fenja Berglund & Ben Way	Middle Temple, University of Sydney, University of Edinburgh	Adam Spencer, University of Sydney	This House believes that strong dictatorship is better than weak democracy.
1995	Princeton, United States	Princeton University	University of New South Wales	James Hooke & Jeremy Phillips	Oxford University	Chitra Jenardhanan, Nanyang Technological University	
1994	Melbourne, Australia	Melbourne	Glasgow University Union	Manus Blessing & Duncan Hamilton	Oxford University, Vassar College, University of Auckland	Ben Richards, Monash University	This House believes that Machiavelli is the way to go.
1993	Oxford, England	Oxford Union Society	Harvard University	David Friedman & David Kennedy	Hart House B, Australian National University A, Macquarie University A	Daniel Mulino, Australian National University	This House would use armed force to make peace.
1992	(Republic of Ireland) Dublin, Ireland	Trinity College Dublin	Glasgow University Union	Robin Marshall & Gordon Peterson	Australian National University, University of Sydney A, University of Sydney B	James Hooke, University of New South Wales & Richard Douglas, Australian National University	Nationalism is a hangover from history.
1991	Toronto, Canada	Hart House, University of Toronto	McGill University	Chris Wayland & Mona Gupta	Dalhousie University	Steve Bibas, University of Oxford	
1990	Glasgow, Scotland	Glasgow University Union	Yale University	Matt Wolf & John Wertheim			
1989	Princeton, United States	Princeton University	University of Sydney	Andrew Bell & Warren Lee	Hart House, University of Toronto	John Gastil, Swarthmore College	
1988	Sydney, Australia	University of Sydney	University of Oxford	Michael Hall & Iain Morley		Francis Greenslade University of Adelaide	
1987	(Republic of Ireland) Dublin, Ireland	University College Dublin	Glasgow University Union	Kevin Sneader & Austin Lally		Michael Hall, University of Oxford	
1986	New York City, United States	Fordham University	University College Cork	Brian Hassett & Siobhán Lankford		Bruce Meagher, University of Sydney	
1985	Montreal, Canada	McGill University	King's Inns	Shane Murphy & Damian Crawford	Brown University	Ashley Black, University of Sydney	
1984	Edinburgh, Scotland	University of Edinburgh	University of Sydney	David Celermajer & Christopher Kelly	Oxford University	David Celermajer, University of Sydney	
1983	Princeton, United States	Princeton University	Glasgow University Dialectic Society	Frank McKirgan & John Nicholson	University of Auckland		This House would humbly apologise for the American revolution.
1982	Toronto, Canada	Hart House, University of Toronto	University of Auckland	Stuart Bugg & David Kidd		Stuart Bugg, University of Auckland	
1981	Glasgow, Scotland	Glasgow University Union	Hart House, University of Toronto	Steve Coughlan & Andrew Taylor	McGill University	Andrew Taylor, Hart House	This House regrets living in the nuclear age.

=== Trans-Atlantic University Speech Association ===
Year	Host city	Hosting institution	Winning institution	Winning open team	Open finalists	Best speaker	Topic of Open Grand Final
1978	London, England	University of London	Glasgow University Union		Victoria University of University of Toronto		
1977	Montreal, Canada	McGill University, Loyola College	Colgate University	Matt Morley & Samuel Abady			
1976	London, England	University of London	Oxford University				

=== The "HONEYWELL" – World Debating Festival ===
Year	Host city	Hosting institution	Winning institution	Winning open team	Open finalists	Best speaker	Topic of Open Grand Final
1978	Sydney, Australia	University of Sydney	University of Sydney		University of Oxford		

== List of notable alumni ==
- Stephanos Bibas, U.S. Circuit Court Judge
- Chris Bishop, New Zealand Member of Parliament
- Gerald Butts, Canadian political consultant
- David Celermajer, Australian Cardiologist
- Ted Cruz, U.S. Senator from Texas
- Rajeev Dhavan, Indian human rights activist
- Anna Donald, Australian epidemiologist
- Liam Fox, UK Member of Parliament
- John Gastil, Professor of Political Science
- Stephen Gethins, British Member of Parliament
- Shuman Ghosemajumder, Canadian entrepreneur
- Austan Goolsbee, former Chair of the U.S. Council of Economic Advisers
- Michael Gove, UK Member of Parliament
- Francis Greenslade, Australian comedic actor
- Duncan Hamilton, Scottish Member of Parliament
- Ian Hanomansing, Canadian journalist
- Richard Humphreys, Irish High Court Judge
- Raybon Kan, New Zealand comedian
- Ryan Knowles, Canadian comedian
- Christian Porter, Australian Member of Parliament
- Frank Luntz, U.S. political consultant
- Nicholas Mostyn, British High Court Judge
- Daniel Mulino, Australian Member of Parliament
- Vikram Nair, Singaporean Member of Parliament
- John Nicolson, Scottish Member of Parliament
- Dara Ó Briain, Irish comedian
- Kelly Rees, Australian Supreme Court judge
- Craig Reucassel, Australian comedian
- Sally Rooney, Irish novelist
- Syed Saddiq, Malaysian Member of Parliament
- Bo Seo, Korean-Australian author and journalist
- Kevin Sneader, former global manager partner of McKinsey & Company
- Adam Spencer, Australian comedian
- Wu Meng Tan, Singaporean Member of Parliament
- Peter van Onselen, Australian journalist
- John Wertheim, U.S. politician
- Simon Wolfson, British life peer
- Tara Zahra, U.S. historian

== See also ==
- HWS Round Robin
- Australasian Intervarsity Debating Championships
- North American Debating Championship
- United Asian Debating Championships
- World Universities Debating Championship in Spanish
- Pan African Universities Debating Championship
