= EUDC =

EUDC may refer to:

- a Windows character editor and TrueType font
- the European Universities Debating Championships
