= NSDC =

NSDC may refer to:

- National Schools Debating Championship, Australian high school debating tournament
- National Security and Defense Council of Ukraine, a government agency
- National Skill Development Corporation, an Indian not-for-profit public limited company
- National Space Defense Center, part of United States Space Command
