= Andrew Coats =

Andrew Coats may refer to:

- Andrew Stewart Coats (born 1958), Australian–British academic cardiologist
- Andrew Coats (director), American director, writer and animator at Pixar
- Andy Coats (born 1935), lawyer and politician who served as mayor of Oklahoma City, Oklahoma
