= Saveetha Institute of Medical and Technical Sciences =

University in Tamil Nadu, India

Saveetha Institute of Medical And Technical Sciences
- Motto: Knowledge Conquers All
- Type: Private Deemed University
- Established: 2005
- Accreditation: NAAC
- Affiliations: NMC
- Chairman: Dr. N. V. Veerian
- Vice-Chancellor: Dr. Rakesh Kumar Sharma
- Academic staff: 270
- Students: 1,314
- Undergraduates: 749
- Postgraduates: 178
- Doctoral students: 387
- Location: Thandalam, Chennai, Tamil Nadu, India; 13°01′37″N 80°01′00″E
- Campus: Urban
- Website: www.saveetha.com

Saveetha Institute of Medical And Technical Sciences is a private and deemed-to-be-university located in Chennai, Tamil Nadu, India. It has nine disciplines of studies: Dental College, School of Management, School of Law, School of Engineering, College of Liberal Arts and Sciences, School of Physiotherapy, School of Nursing and Medical College. The first three disciplines are in Poonamalle while the rest are in Thandalam.

== History ==
Saveetha Dental college was started in the year 1988 and in 2005 it was established as a deemed university and renamed as Saveetha Institute of Medical and Technical Sciences.

== Campus facilities ==
=== Poonamallee campus ===
The Poonamalle campus in Chennai consist of Dental College, School of Management, School of Law.

=== Thandalam Campus ===
The Thandalam campus consist of School of Engineering, School of Physiotherapy, School of Nursing and Medical College, College of Liberal Arts and Sciences.

== Rankings ==
University rankings

General – India
- NIRF (Overall) (2024): 22
- NIRF (Universities) (2024): 11

Medical – India
- NIRF (2024): 12

Dental – India
- NIRF (2024): 1

The National Institutional Ranking Framework (NIRF) ranked Saveetha Institute of Medical And Technical Sciences 11th among universities in India in 2024 and 22nd overall. In dental rankings it was ranked first and 12th in medical rankings in India in 2024.

== Allegations of citation manipulation ==
In 2023, the institute was accused of inflating its citation rankings though the use of undergraduate written papers that had heavy self-citations to works written by employees of the institute. In 2024, the college was again accused of inflating its citations by having its scholars publish AI-written commentaries in journals which extensively cited other Saveetha scholars. In July 2025, a total of 25 research papers authored by Dr. Joseph Raj Xavier of Saveetha University were retracted following findings of image duplication and manipulation.
