= David Celermajer =

Australian cardiologist

Professor David Celermajer AO DSC FAHA FRACP FAA

Scandrett Professor of Cardiology, University of Sydney

Personal details
- Born: David Stephen Celermajer; 8 December 1961 (age 64)

David Stephen Celermajer (born 8 December 1961) is an Australian cardiologist and the Scandrett Professor of Cardiology at the University of Sydney.

== Early life and education ==
Celermajer is the son of John and Tina Celermajer, both Polish Jews who survived the Holocaust. When he was eleven Celermajer won a scholarship to Sydney Grammar School. He went on to win the World Universities Debating Championship, on two occasions. He graduated from the University of Sydney with a medical degree in 1983 (first in class, University Medal), and won a Rhodes Scholarship that same year. He has a PhD in children's heart disease from the University of London, which he received in 1993, and a higher-doctorate D.Sc. from the University of Sydney.

== Career ==
In 2003 Celermajer was appointed the Clinical Director of the Heart Research Institute. He is the Scandrett Professor of Cardiology at the University of Sydney and Head of the Department of Cardiology at Royal Prince Alfred Hospital. He has authored over 680 publications with more than 80,000 citations and has received numerous national and international awards for his contributions to cardiology and clinical research.

== Research ==
In 1996 Celermajer published a study showing that exposure to secondhand smoke was associated with "dose-related impairment of endothelium-dependent dilatation" in the arteries of healthy young adults. Celermajer's current research focuses on congenital heart disease, atherosclerosis, and pulmonary vascular disease, spanning basic, clinical, and public health domains. He led the creation of the world's largest national congenital heart disease registry, has co-authored national and international guidelines, and has contributed to several medical innovations, including novel heart failure devices. His work has significantly influenced clinical practice and health policy in cardiovascular medicine, worldwide.

== Honors and awards ==
In 2002 Celermajer was awarded the Commonwealth Health Minister's Award for Excellence in Health and Medical Research, and in 2006, he was elected a fellow of the Australian Academy of Science. In 2014, he was named an Officer of the Order of Australia for his "distinguished service to medicine in the field of cardiology, as a clinician and researcher, to improved medical diagnostic methods, and to the promotion of heart health, particularly in children and young adults." In 2018 he was elected Fellow of the Australian Academy of Health and Medical Sciences.

== Personal life ==
Celermajer is married to Noirin Celermajer, whom he met at Royal Prince Alfred Hospital when they were both trainees there. They have 3 adult children and 3 grandchildren.
