= Rajalakshmi Institutions =

Group of educational institutions in Chennai

- Formation: 1997
- Type: private Educational organization
- Purpose: Educational
- Headquarters: Chennai, Tamil Nadu, India.
- Location: Chennai, Tamil Nadu, India.
- Coordinates: 13.009643°N 80.004335°E
- Chairman of the Board: Mr. S. Meganathan
- Key people: Dr. Mrs. Thangam Meganathan, Mr. Abhay Shankar Meganathan, Dr. Haree Shankar Meganathan
- Website: www.rajalakshmi.org

Rajalakshmi Institutions is a group of private educational institutes in Chennai, Tamil Nadu, India founded by Mr. S. Meganathan in the year 1997. This group of institutes provide higher education and school level educations to students in and around India.

== Rajalakshmi Group Of Institutions ==
- Rajalakshmi Engineering College, 1997.
- Rajalakshmi School of Management, 1997.
- Rajalakshmi College of Educations, 2006, offering B.Ed. and M.Ed. programmes(Teacher Training), approved and affiliated to Tamil Nadu Teachers Education University.
- Rajalakshmi Institute of Technology, 2008.
- Rajalakshmi College of Nursing, 2008, approved and affiliated to Nursing Council of India and Tamil Nadu Dr. M.G.R. Medical University.
- Rajalakshmi School of Architecture, 2010.
- Rajalakshmi Vidyashram
- Rajalakshmi Automobiles Private Limited ( Dealers of Mahindra Navistar and Mahindra Construction Equipments).
- Rajalakshmi Education Private Limited, 2012, offering B.Sc., M.Sc. and MBA programmes.

Name	Logo	Short Name	Established	City/Town	State/UT	Website
Rajalakshmi Engineering College		REC	1997	Thandalam, Chennai	Tamil Nadu	www.rajalakshmi.org
Rajalakshmi School of Management		RSM	1997	Thandalam, Chennai	Tamil Nadu	www.rajalakshmi.org/dept-mba-intro.html
Rajalakshmi College of Educations,		RCE	2006	Thandalam, Chennai	Tamil Nadu	www.rajalakshmieducation.org/index.html
Rajalakshmi Institute of Technology	RIT Logo	RIT	2008	Kuthambakkam, Tiruvallur	Tamil Nadu	www.ritchennai.org
Rajalakshmi College of Nursing		RCN	2010	Thandalam, Chennai	Tamil Nadu	www.rajalakshmiinstitutes.edu.in/rcn.html
Rajalakshmi School of Architecture		RSA	2010	Thandalam, Chennai	Tamil Nadu	architecture.rajalakshmi.org
Rajalakshmi Automobiles Private Limited		RAPL	2010	Chennai	Tamil Nadu	rajalakshmiautomobiles.com/index.html

== See also ==
- Rajalakshmi Engineering College
- Anna University
- Anna University Chennai
- National Board of Accreditation
- National Assessment & Accreditation Council
- All India Council for Technical Education
- Council of Architecture
