= Stuart G. Bugg =

New Zealand lawyer

Stuart Guy Bugg (born 4 November 1958) is a lawyer, author and consultant specialising in commercial law and contract law and contract management.

Bugg was born in Hull, England, but grew up in Tauranga, New Zealand. He attended Tauranga Boys' College and studied politics and law at Victoria University of Wellington and the University of Auckland in New Zealand. He graduated with a Bachelor of Arts in Politics (B.A.), and completed an honours degree in law (LL.B (Hons)), as well as a postgraduate degree in jurisprudence with distinction (M.Jur (Dist)).

In 1982 he became World Universities Champion in Public Speaking and Debating at the University of Toronto. He has worked as a tutor at the Law School, University of Auckland, and as a lecturer at the University of Maryland and the University of Erlangen-Nuremberg. He is a founding member of the European Forum for Migration Studies (EFMS), associated with the University of Bamberg, Germany.

He has been involved in developing training programmes in English, especially in the field of contract law and business communication, for industry and government organisations. He is also co-author of Langenscheidt's Fachwörterbuch Kompaktrecht Englisch-Deutsch, and Contract in English from C.H. Beck Verlag.

He has lived in Germany since 1985 and practices law in Nuremberg as a partner in the law firm of Augustin & Bugg. He has qualified as a Rechtsanwalt (Germany), a solicitor of the Supreme Court of England and Wales, a barrister and solicitor of the High Court of New Zealand and a legal practitioner at the Supreme Court ACT, Canberra, Australia. He is currently a member of the Law Society (England & Wales), Deutscher Anwaltverein, as well as the Nuremberg Regional Law Society (Rechtsanwaltskammer Nürnberg).

== Publications ==
- Stuart G. Bugg, Heike Simon. (2006). Langenscheidt Fachwörterbuch Kompakt Recht. Langenscheidt und Alpmann, Munich. ISBN 978-3-89476-798-3.
- Stuart G. Bugg. (December 2009). Contracts in English. Beck Juristischer Verlag, Munich. ISBN 978-3-406-58567-8.
