= Pan African Universities Debating Championship =

- Established: 2008
- Region: Africa
- Format: British Parliamentary Style
- Number of Teams: ~80-150
- Record participation: ~145 teams (2012)
- Current champions: University of Ghana
- Most championships: KNUST (4), University of the Witwatersrand (3), University of Cape Town (3), Rhodes University (2)

Pan-African Universities Debating Championship (PAUDC) is the biggest intercollegiate debate championship in Africa, established in 2008 by the University of Botswana Debate Masters Association. PAUDC is held in the British Parliamentary debate format (involving four teams of two people in each debate).

The 2021 edition of the PAUDC was the 2nd edition to be held virtually as a result of travel restrictions and other issues caused by the COVID-19 pandemic. The virtual tournament was hosted by the University of Botswana Debate Masters Association in Botswana under the theme, “Channeling the roots of African Debate.”

The current PAUDC champions are Joel Kwodzo Yayra Aboagye and Jedidiah Kwame Henaku-Budu of University of Ghana.

The 2026 Edition and the 18th Edition of this tournament, will be hosted in Abuja, Nigeria at the Veritas University and has been slated for December 2026.

== History ==
The OSI African Regional Office and the Youth Initiative partnered with the Pan-African Universities Debating Championship (PAUDC) organizing committee and the University of Botswana to organize the first-ever Pan African Universities Debating Championship in 2008 to provide students from various African universities the opportunity to interrogate issues of African and Global importance.

== Format ==
The championship is usually held in eight days. It usually takes place in the first two weeks of December and is being hosted in a different country every year

The PAUDC structure is the British Parliamentary (BP), made up of four teams of two, with two teams supporting a motion, and two teams opposing. Debating teams are independent and compete with each other.

The competition involves nine preliminary rounds, which become "power-paired" as the tournament progresses, matching the strongest-performing teams against each other. The process of scoring and pairing these teams is known as "tabbing". The scoring of teams is done by judges, most of whom are students or former students from the competing institutions, who then return "ballots" with their scores to the adjudication team, led by a Chief Adjudicator who is assisted by one or more deputies.

At the end of the debate, teams are ranked from 1st to 4th.

The team names are as follows. Opening Government (OG), consisting of the Prime Minister and Deputy Prime Minister; Opening Opposition (OO), consisting of the Opposition Leader and Deputy Opposition Leader; Closing Government (CG), consisting of the Government Member and Government Whip; and Closing Opposition (CO), consisting of the Opposition Member and the Opposition Whip.

The speaking order is Prime Minister, Opposition Leader, Deputy Prime Minister, Deputy Opposition Leader, and so forth.

Notable Controversies

The PAUDC 2023 event unfolded as a manifestation of deceptive advertising, unfulfilled pledges, and forgery. The convener, Abdoul Latif Wali, had assured an engaging 11-day tournament brimming with entertainment and intellectual discourse. However, participants were confronted with the stark reality upon their arrival, discovering substandard accommodations in close proximity to a brewery emanating odors of alcohol and dilapidated restroom facilities. Furthermore, the promised inclusion of breakfast in the tournament registration cost was conspicuously absent.

Compounding the grievances, it was uncovered during the tournament that the Universite de Lome, purportedly the host institution, was entirely unaware of the PAUDC transpiring on their campus. Alarming revelations emerged that Abdoul Latif Wali had fabricated acceptance letters from the university, amplifying the level to which participants had been hoodwinked into a sub-par tournament with an underwhelming tournament experience.

== List of tournaments ==
Year	Host city	Hosting Institution	Winning Institution	Final Motion	Best Speaker	Winning team
8-14 December 2008	Botswana, Gaborone	University of Botswana	Won by the University of the Free State, South Africa			
12-18 December 2009	Botswana, Gaborone	University of Botswana	Won by Rhodes University, South Africa	GF: THW abolish all limits on immigration.		
4-11 December 2010	Namibia, Windhoek	University of Namibia	Won by University of the Witwatersrand, Johannesburg			
4-11 December 2011	Zimbabwe, Bulawayo	Falcon College	Won by the University of Pretoria, South Africa	THW have the African Union take over all peacekeeping duties in Africa		
9-15 December 2012	South Africa, Pretoria	Tshwane University of Technology	Won by the University of Cape Town, South Africa		Mighti Jamie	
November 29- December 8, 2013	Nigeria, Calabar	University of Calabar	Won by the University of Cape Town, South Africa			
4-12 December 2014	South Africa, Polokwane	University of Limpopo	Won by the University of Botswana, Botswana	INFO SLIDE THR Kim Kardashian's recent photoshoot.		
8-17 December 2015	Ghana, Accra	University of Ghana	Won by University of the Witwatersrand, Johannesburg		Mighti Jamie	
9-17 December 2016	Zimbabwe, Gweru	Midlands State University	Won by University of the Witwatersrand, Johannesburg			
7-15 December 2017	Cameroon, Buea	University of Buea	Won by Midlands State University, Zimbabwe		Minenhle Nzana	
8-16 December 2018	Tanzania, Dars es Salaam	University of Dars es Salaam	Won by Kwame Nkrumah University of Science and Technology (KNUST)			
8-16 December 2019	Ghana. Kumasi	Kwame Nkrumah University of Science and Technology	Won by Kwame Nkrumah University of Science and Technology (KNUST)		Adekunbi Ademola	Micheal Ampah and Erasmus Mawuli Segbefia
14-20 December 2020	Virtual	Makerere University and Royal Rhetorics	Won by Kwame Nkrumah University of Science and Technology (KNUST)	This House Believes That judicial systems should more harshly punish people found guilty of committing crimes against members of social groups who experience disproportionately high rates of violence regardless of that offender’s intent (i.e. women, ethnic minorities)	lindokuhle Mabaso and Dan Lee	Kojo Opoku Acheampong and Abena Achiaa Otuo
09-12 December 2021	Virtual	University of Botswana	Won by Rhodes University (South Africa)	THW, as the African Union, Grant members of the 6th Region economic and Political Rights	Sodiq Farhan	Franciscus Crouse and Oyisa Katshaza
08-15 December 2022	Nairobi	Strathmore University	Won by Veritas University (Nigeria)	THBT that the AU should recognise the statehood of Somaliland	Elisha Owusu Akyaw	Ayafa Tonye, Edwin Ochiedo
03-11 December 2023	Lome	Universite de Lome	Won by Kwame Nkrumah University of Science and Technology (KNUST)	Champagne socialism refers to a form of socialism where a group of rich/upper class individuals advocate for a fair society where everyone has equal rights and the rich people help the poor. THW promote champagne socialism in Africa	Prosper-Michael Ametu and Umuhairu Teni Alhassan	Prosper-Michael Ametu and Umuhairu Teni Alhassan
15-22 December 2024	Kampala	Kyambogo University	Winners, Debate: University of Cape Town, Public Speech: Kyambogo University	THR the decline of Ubuntu in African Communities.	Debate: Michelle Adika & Alec Becky, PS: Onyait Churchill.	Menzimuhle Ncube & Providence Nhongo.
1-8 December 2025	Johannesburg	University of Witwatersrand	Winners: University of Ghana	Info slide: The Waka-Trix (Wakanda Matrix) is a fully immersive digital world presenting a plausible alternate Africa and global system in which colonialism and its direct consequences never occurred. This world is still subject to natural, political, and social imperfection. Upon entry to the Waka-Trix, your physical body dies, and all contact with the real world ceases. You enter the Waka-Trix as a newborn baby, with no memories or continued consciousness from the real world. Motion: TH, as an average 20-year-old African person, would enter the Waka-Trix.	Joel Kwodzo Yayra Aboagye	Ghana C: Joel Kwodzo Yayra Aboagye and Jedidiah Kwame Henaku-Budu
December 2026	Abuja	Veritas University	To be determined	To be determined.	To be determined.	To be determined.

== See also ==
- World universities debating championship
- Literary and Debating Society (NUI Galway)
