= Philip Poole-Wilson =

British academic cardiologist

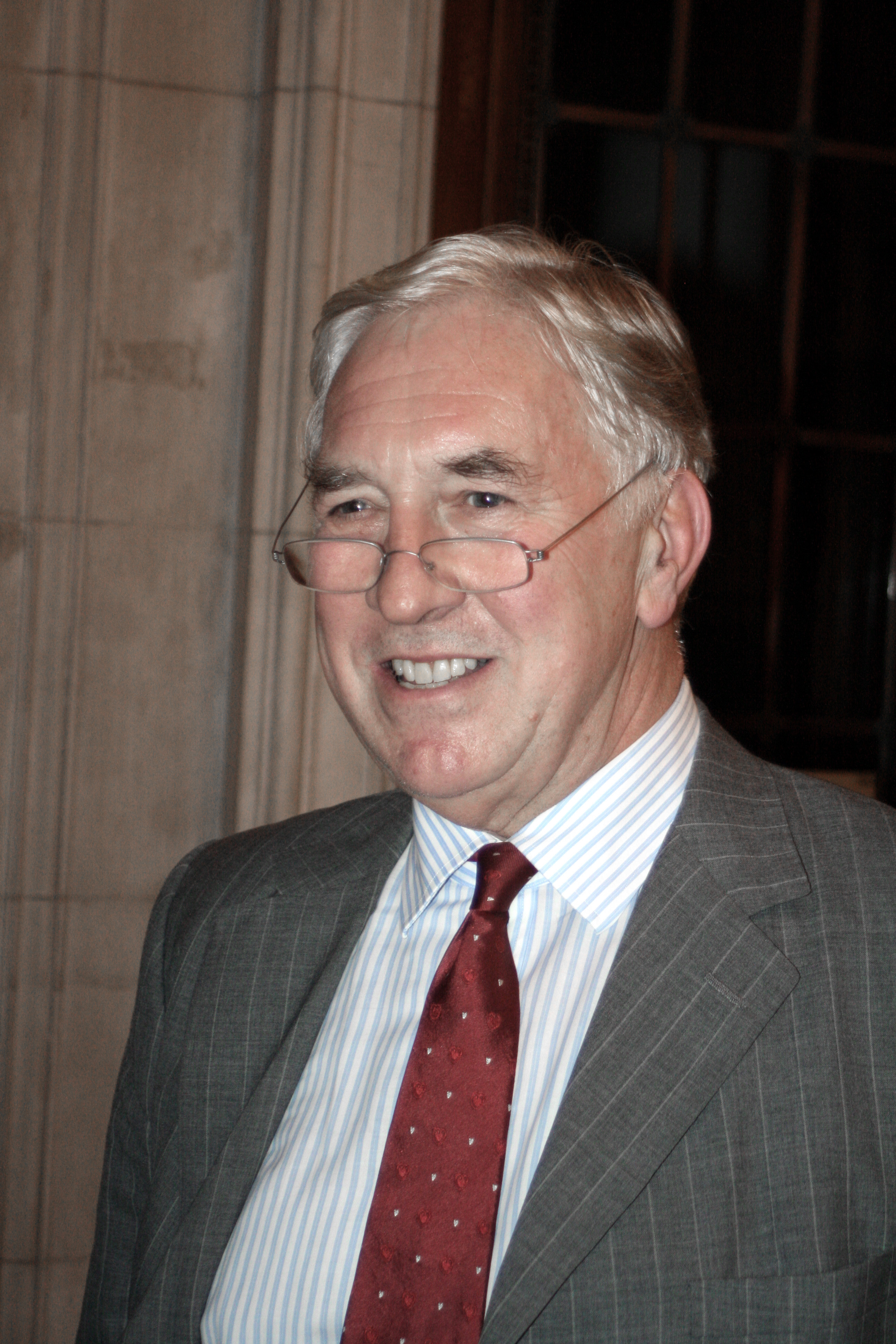
Philip Poole-wilson

Philip Alexander Poole-Wilson FRCP, FESC, FACC, FMedSci (26 April 1943 – 4 March 2009) was a British academic cardiologist of international reputation who had particular interest in the management of heart failure. His research helped to identify the cellular mechanisms behind heart failure and was also important in improving treatment for patients. He was instrumental in raising the profile of heart failure as a major public health problem.

== Early life ==
Poole-Wilson was born in London. His father Denis was a genitourological surgeon who developed an internationally recognised department of urology in Manchester.

Poole-Wilson was educated at Marlborough College in Wiltshire where he was senior scholar, Trinity College, Cambridge, and St Thomas' Hospital Medical School (now a part of King's College London), University of London, where he was an exhibitioner and received the Stewart Grainger Prize.

At the University of Cambridge, Poole-Wilson was a major scholar, initially studying maths and physics before switched to natural sciences and then to medicine.

== Medical career ==
After qualifying in medicine in 1967, Poole-Wilson started his career with training posts in London hospitals. In 1973 he was awarded a British-American Research Fellowship, supported by the British Heart Foundation, and undertook research in the well-known heart lab at UCLA, California, then under the chairmanship of Glenn Langer. There he learnt to measure the movement of K, Na and Ca ions in the isolated, but arterially perfused, interventricular preparation which could be made truly ischaemic. He studied the effects of acidosis and ischaemia on myocardial function and Ca exchange and his early results suggested that developed force and Ca exchange were more responsive to acidosis within the cell than to extracellular acidosis. Something we are much more aware of today. Returning to the UK in 1976 he was appointed senior lecturer at the Cardiothoracic Institute (later to become the National Heart and Lung Institute [NHLI]) under Peter Harris for whom he had eternal regard. His honorary consultant physician status at the National Heart Hospital allowed him to investigate the mechanisms underlying K ion loss from hypoxic and ischaemic tissue both in the laboratory and in the clinic where he was one of the first to measure the K ion concentration and pH in the coronary vessels of humans using catheter-based ion sensitive electrodes.

In 1982 Poole-Wilson was appointed professor of cardiology at the University of London and then in 1988, he became the British Heart Foundation Simon Marks professor of cardiology at NHLI. He was also honorary consultant physician at the Royal Brompton Hospital London, and, from 2003, head of cardiovascular sciences at NHLI. He was the first head of NHLI (1997–2000) when it became a division of the faculty of medicine of Imperial College London.

He retired from clinical practice in 2008 but continued as emeritus professor of cardiology at NHLI.

== Research achievements ==
Poole-Wilson was interested in heart failure, coronary heart disease and the global prevention of heart disease and stroke. Heart failure was his major research focus and his work covered both basic science (laboratory studies) and clinical research. He was an enthusiastic supporter of high-quality fundamental research and a strong advocate of translational research so that what was learnt in the laboratory could be implemented more quickly and efficiently in medical practice.

Following his early interest in the movement of K, Na and Ca ions across cardiac cell membranes and how these altered contraction, he became interested in studying similar processes that lead to the decline of contractile function as the heart started to fail. At the same time his clinical work with George Sutton at Hillingdon Hospital led to them writing a letter to the BMJ highlighting a concern with the prevalence of heart failure in the community. Philip Poole-Wilson succeeded in bringing these two areas - the pathophysiology and the clinical predicament - together, eventually leading an academic department that bridged the interface of those disciplines. His own work led to greater understanding of the cellular mechanisms underlying ischaemic and failing myocardium. The overall process led to him becoming an expert in the manifestations of heart failure at the cellular, organ, and whole body levels, an expert in designing therapies appropriate for dealing with the symptoms of the disease and an expert in the disease implications for healthcare worldwide.

Further research, with others, helped elucidate the body's neurohormonal response in heart failure. This in turn helped development of modern drug therapy for heart failure which has markedly improved the prognosis for patients. He made a major start to the study of muscle changes in heart failure, which he carried on for many years with colleague, Professor Andrew Justin Stewart Coats under the banner "The Muscle Hypothesis" the accepted explanation for the generation of exercise-limiting symptoms in chronic heart failure, but at the time a radical theory. More prosaic perhaps, but important to day-to-day practice, Poole-Wilson played a part in introducing the six-minute walk test as an easy way of assessing exercise capacity in patients with heart failure. He published a paper on this in 1986. Unknown to him, a similar article had been published a few months earlier by researchers in Canada. In an interview shortly before his death Poole-Wilson commented: "We both copied the idea from the lung doctors, but the test is now used worldwide, and that is what matters."

His interests in the epidemiology of heart failure involved him in studies which showed that heart failure in the UK was much more common than was generally thought and that it was most often caused by coronary heart disease.

Cardiovascular disease in women and the effects of ovarian hormones in arteries were also among his special interests. Studies he helped design and became involved with included the effects of oestradiol-17B on intracellular calcium regulation in cardiac and endothelial cells, the effects of oestrogen in coronary arteries in vivo that showed beneficial effects in women, not in men and those that showed positive effects of estradiol in women with Syndrome X.

He recognized that while drug therapy could stabilize episodes of acute decompensation in patients with heart failure, long-term medical management often remained limited. He took an interest in the development of reliable, untethered left ventricular assist devices (LVADs), and, together with Stephen Westaby at Oxford, assessed a number of patients who subsequently received the Jarvik axial impeller pump as long-term therapy. None of these patients were suitable candidates for transplantation. Although the series was small, the findings were published in The Lancet. One patient survived for seven years with an LVAD. He also supported the need for a properly conducted randomized controlled trial to establish evidence and address concerns about “technology creep”, although such a trial was not completed during his lifetime.

He was chairman or a member of the steering committee of many large-scale international drug trials that have influenced treatment of cardiovascular disease. These include ATLAS (lisinopril in heart failure), COMET (beta-blockers in heart failure), ACTION (nifedipine in chronic angina), and SENIORS (management of heart failure in the elderly).

He published widely, with 557 items on PubMed as of February 2011 (several studies with which he was involved were published after his death).

== National and international work ==
Poole-Wilson was founding chairman of the British Society for Heart Failure (1998). He sat on many committees within the UK including the Department of Health, the Medical Research Council, the British Heart Foundation and the Royal College of Physicians.

In his later career, he became influential on the wider political stage. In 1994 he became the first English (and at the age of 51 the youngest ever) president of the European Society of Cardiology (after serving as a councillor in 1988 and as secretary in 1990), serving until 1996. During his presidency the society underwent significant enlargement and reorganisation and strengthened its strategic role. He was president of the World Heart Federation from 2003 to 2005 and worked hard to raise awareness of the epidemic of chronic cardiovascular disease in developing countries at a time when more attention was focused on infectious disease.

As a result of blending basic science with clinical medicine and being politically active one of Poole-Wilson's major accomplishments was the organization of international cardiology. He began his career when cardiology in most European countries was dominated by national societies in which basic science and clinical medicine were almost entirely separate areas of study. As a result, information was generally exchanged among small groups of scientists and physicians who had trained together, spoke a single language, and shared a limited viewpoint. By playing a major role in the development of the European Society of Cardiology, which he then helped integrate with other international societies, Philip Poole-Wilson can be viewed as one of the founders of modern cardiology.

In 2006, he was successfully awarded a grant from the British Council under the UK-India Education and Research Initiative (UKIERI). This research collaboration he organised, between the All India Institute of Medical Sciences, and the Royal Brompton Hospital and Imperial College, continues to flourish, and aims to improve public health using varied strategies for the diagnosis and management of Heart Failure. The projects involve all levels of staff and both British and Indian patients, with alternating annual symposia in Delhi and London, held in his name"

It has been suggested that Philip Poole-Wilson can also be considered the 'father of heart failure' across Europe and even across the world, and that it was largely thanks to his efforts to raise the profile of heart failure that it is no longer considered the Cinderella of cardiology. He looked upon cardiology as "my hobby". It was an extremely successful hobby.

== Death ==
Poole-Wilson died from a heart attack in London, in 2009, aged 65 years, while travelling to lecture medical students.

== Family ==
He married Mary Tattersall in 1969 and they had two sons and a daughter.

== Awards ==
- Gold medal of the European Society of Cardiology (1996)
- Le Prix Europe et Medicine de l’Institut des Sciences de la Santé (2001)
- Mackenzie Medal of the British Cardiovascular Society (2007)
- National Forum Chair Recognition Award for service as a member of Collaboration and Implementation Group and contributions to global heart diseases prevention. The American National Forum for Heart Disease and Stroke Prevention (2009)
