= European Universities Debating Championships =

Large European debate competition

The European Universities Debating Championship, abbreviated as the EUDC, is Europe's largest and most prestigious debating tournament. It is held annually at the university level and rounds happen in the British Parliamentary style of debate. ESL teams, if eliminated by the open rounds, partake in their own rounds, which are also considered prestigious. The tournament is governed by the EUDC council, which selects where each year's edition is held.

The championship has occasionally been impacted by geopolitical tensions regarding Israel. A 2018 boycott by Qatar University led to a constitutional amendment banning national origin discrimination, while protests against the alleged military involvement of Israeli universities and concerns over an Israeli genocide in 2026 forced the tournament's finals to be held behind closed doors.

== Format ==
The tournament's term varies, but it is traditionally held between the months of July and August. The attendance is between 150 and 180 teams of two debaters each. Certain editions had up to 700 participants. There are 9 preliminary rounds in each tournament, and some advance, or "break", into the elimination rounds, with the goal being to advance roughly 10-20% of teams into the "open" category. In recent years, the trend has been to advance 24 teams. The top 8 teams advance directly to quarterfinals, with the bottom 16 facing off in partial octofinals. The winner of the elimination bracket is crowned EUDC champion, which, besides a trophy and status, grants them entry into the HWS Round Robin tournament.

Concurrently with the open category, the top ESL teams have their own elimination rounds, with the top 16 ESL teams advancing into quarterfinals. The winner of this category is crowned ESL champion, which is in itself a prestigious title.

The competition also compares the best speakers by averaging their individual speaker scores in preliminary rounds. This individual competition also has an ESL edition.

Motions (the topics of debates) are selected by the Chief Adjudication team, referred to as the CAP. The members of CAP are selected by the host of a given year's edition.

== Governance ==
The tournament is governed by the EUDC Council. It selects the convenors of each edition and drafts and amends the constitution. The tournament body contains 308 universities and 53 eligible countries. Votes are cast on a one-country, one-vote basis.

The council determines which countries can attend EUDC and which ones cannot. For instance, even countries geographically outside of Europe are allowed to compete—like Qatar in 2010, Palestine in 2018 or Israel, which managed to reach finals for the first time in 2009 and win in 2018.

== Notable controversies ==
In the third round of the 2018 edition of EUDC in Novi Sad, a team from Qatar University refused to participate in debate against a team from Hebrew University of Jerusalem. As it was unclear whether this was mandated by their university or the team's personal choice, the equity team removed their eligibility to advance in the tournament, citing that "The behaviour of the Qatar team is the same as if debaters were refusing to speak in rooms with someone because of any other immutable characteristic, such as: race, gender, or sexual orientation". After the incident, EUDC changed its constitution to explicitly ban teams discriminating other teams on the basis of unelected identity characteristics.

The finals of the 2026 edition, hosted in Utrecht University, were cancelled by cultural centre TivoliVredenburg, forcing them to be recorded and streamed online instead. The university's official statement says, "new information raises reasonable doubts [...] about any institutional involvement by Israeli universities". These doubts were over Israeli students in the finals comprising Israeli military, as well as a broader concern of an Israeli genocide. The cancellation was on 30 July, the day before the finals would've taken place. Geerten Waling, writing for Union Monitor, attributed the cancellation to a "cultural boycott" and condemned it.

== List of tournaments ==
Year	Host city	Winning institution	Winning open team	Best speaker	Winning ESL team	Best ESL speaker
2027	Vienna					
2026	Utrecht	Oxford Union, England	Bharath Anantham & Gareth Lim Yefeng	Bharath Anantham	David Safro & Maj Hrovatin	David Safro
2025	Copenhagen	University of Zagreb, Croatia	Paula Djaković & Petar Žnidar	Jack Story	Leo Marinopoulous & Max Papaioannides	Kristjan Suuder
2024	Glasgow	College Historical Society, Ireland	Martha McKinney-Perry & Andy Cullinan	Hadar Goldberg	Jagoda Sabljić & Petar Žnidar	Hadar Goldberg
2023	Burgas	Sofia University, Bulgaria	Alek Selveliev & Velina Andonova	Alek Selveliev	Biser Angelov & Maria Matcheva	Alek Selveliev
2022	Zagreb	University Philosophical Society, Ireland	Dylan McCarthy & Jack Palmer	Tamar Ben Meir	Hadar Goldberg & Tamar Ben Meir	Tamar Ben Meir
2021	Madrid	Oxford Union, England	Oskar Sherry & Rachel O'Nunain	Jack Synnott	Rok Hafner & Filip Korošec	Tamar Ben Meir
2020	Astana	Leiden University, Netherlands	David Metz & Emma Lucus	Hamza Tariq Chaudhry	Katharina Margareta Jansen & Louis Honee	Emma Lucus
2019	Athens	Cambridge Union, England	Trenton Sewell & Ian Wu	Srishti Krishnamoorthy Cavell	Tin Puljić & Lovro Šprem	Tin Puljić
2018	Novi Sad	Tel Aviv University, Israel	Tom Manor & Noam Dahan	Lucia Arce Cubas	Amichay Even Chen & Ido Kotler	Lucia Arce Cubas
2017	Tallinn	University of Glasgow, Scotland	Bethany Garry & Owen Mooney	Bethany Garry & Matt Hazell	Tom Manor & Noam Dahan	Floris Holstege
2016	Warsaw	PEP Belgrade, Serbia	Michael Dunn Goekjian & Stefan Siridžanski	Michael Dunn Goekjian	Dan Lahav & Ayal Hayut-man	Dan Lahav
2015	Vienna	University of St Andrews, Scotland	Ruairidh Macintosh & Alex Don	Alex Don	Stav Singer & Iddan Golomb	Dan Lahav
2014	Zagreb	University of Sheffield, England	Adam Hawksbee & Matthew Willmore	Ben Adams	Stefan Siridzanski & Helana Ivanov	Helena Ivanov
2013	Manchester	Cambridge Union, England	Ashish Kumar & Anser Aftab	Sally Rooney	Emilia Carlqvist & Peer Klüßendorf	Viktor Prlja
2012	Belgrade	BPP University, England	Harish Natarajan & Jack Watson	Maria English	Menno Schellekens & Daan Welling	Danique Van Koppenhagen
