= Heart Research Institute =

The Heart Research Institute (HRI) is a not-for-profit research facility, originally based in Camperdown, New South Wales, Australia and currently based in Newtown, New South Wales.

Established in 1989 by a group of cardiologists at Royal Prince Alfred Hospital, HRI is an internationally recognised medical research institute that performs groundbreaking cardiovascular research.

== History ==
The Heart Research Institute was officially opened on 17 March 1989, spearheaded by a group of cardiologists at Sydney's Royal Prince Alfred Hospital, led by David Richmond, and also supported by The University of Sydney.

The original vision was to create NSW's first medical research institute dedicated to the detection, prevention and treatment of heart disease.

In September 2009, the Institute relocated from its Camperdown, New South Wales site to its present site in Newtown, New South Wales. The institute was opened by Quentin Bryce AC, the Governor-General of Australia.

HRI has maintained a strong tradition of clinical research ever since that has led to multiple breakthroughs and groundbreaking discoveries.

== Location and facilities ==
The HRI, currently located within a purpose-built building on 7 Eliza Street, Newtown, New South Wales, is closely located to the Royal Prince Alfred Hospital and the University of Sydney.

The HRI has state-of-the-art research laboratories and support facilities.

== Notable people ==
=== CEO and Scientific Director ===
- Prof. Andrew Coats AO

=== Director of Science Strategy ===
- Prof. Mathew Vadas AO

=== Clinical Director ===
- Prof. David Celermajer

=== Group Leaders ===
- Prof David Celermajer AO – Clinical Research Group
- Prof Ben Freedman – Heart Rhythm and Stroke Prevention Group
- Prof Annemarie Hennessy – Vascular Immunology Group
- Prof Mary Kavurma – Vascular Complications Group
- Assoc Prof. Sanjay Patel – Cell Therapeutics Group
- Dr Ashish Misra – Atherosclerosis and Vascular Remodelling Unit
- Dr Sergey Tumanov – Fluxomics Centre
- Dr Xuyu (Johnny) Liu – Cardiovascular-protective Signalling and Drug Discovery Unit
- Dr Christopher Stanley – Microvascular Research Unit

== See also ==
- Health in Australia
- Cardiovascular disease in Australia
