= John Gastil =

American professor (born 1967)

- Born: 1967 (age 58–59)
- Title: Professor of Communication Arts & Sciences, Professor of Political Science

Academic work
- Institutions: Penn State University, The McCourtney Institute for Democracy
- Main interests: Citizens' Initiative Review, Deliberative democracy

John Gastil (born 1967) currently holds a joint appointment as Professor of Communication Arts & Sciences and Professor of Political Science at Penn State University. He is known for his research on deliberative democracy and group decision making.

== Biography ==
John Gastil was born in San Diego and raised in a Quaker family. His experiences in Quaker meetings sparked his interest in how people work within groups to make decisions, reach a consensus at certain times, and defend their positions through reason and evidence. Gastil earned a B.A. in political science from Swarthmore College in 1989 and an M.A. (1991) and Ph.D. (1994) in Communication Arts from the University of Wisconsin-Madison. He previously taught at the University of Washington and served as Head of the Department of Communication Arts & Sciences and as Director of The McCourtney Institute for Democracy at Penn State University.

== Research ==
Gastil’s early research culminated in his 1993 book Democracy in Small Groups. In it he explored the workings of group decision rules, the establishment and maintenance of democratic norms, and the emergence of deliberative practices.

Some of his later research examined the jury, one of the most important venues through which ordinary citizens can deliberate and make consequential decisions. Building on the insights of Alexis de Tocqueville and others, Gastil and his coauthors produced in The Jury and Democracy the first large-scale study of how jury service affects those who participate. Gastil shows the effects on jury members’ civic attitudes, views about legal institutions, opinions about deliberation, and subsequent participation in politics. The Jury and Democracy won the 2011 Ernest Bormann Research Award from the National Communication Association.

Gastil is also widely credited for promoting deliberation among citizens during elections and in other political institutions. In his book By Popular Demand, he proposed creating panels of citizens, chosen randomly to ensure a cross-section of society, to deliberate on ballot initiatives and referendums. In 2010 Oregon became the first state to implement this idea through its Citizens’ Initiative Review (CIR). Oregon reports the results of these deliberations through the state’s official voter’s pamphlet. Similar policies have now been adopted by a handful of other states, and Gastil’s research on Oregon’s CIR has been cited repeatedly in both academic journals and the news media. Gastil has testified before the legislatures of Oregon, Washington, and Massachusetts about these deliberative processes.

== Selected publications ==
• Gastil, J., Knobloch, K. (2020). Hope for democracy: How citizens can bring reason back into politics. New York: Oxford University Press.

• Gastil, John, E. Pierre Deess, Philip J. Weiser, and Cindy Simmons (2010). The Jury and Democracy: How Jury Deliberation Promotes Civic Engagement and Political Participation. New York: Oxford University Press.

• Gastil, John (2000). By Popular Demand: Revitalizing Representative Democracy through Deliberative Elections. Berkeley, CA: University of California Press.

• Gastil, John (1993, 2nd. ed. 2014). Democracy in Small Groups: Participation, Decision Making, and Communication. Philadelphia: New Society Publishers.
