= Asociación Mexicana de Debate =

Regulating body for debate in Mexico

Asociación Mexicana de Debate (Mexican Debate Association)
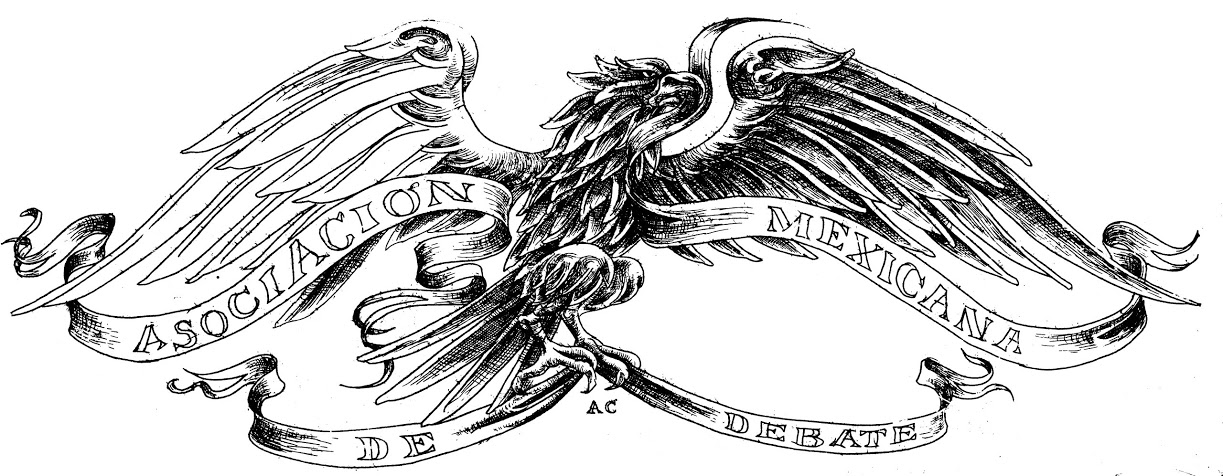
- Formation: 2015
- Founders: Ariel de la Garza, David Alatorre López, Mark Webber, Montserrat Legorreta, Nicholas Ferezin, Patricio Dávila, Rodolfo Flores, Sergio Luna, Víctor López Martínez
- Type: National debating organization
- Location: Mexico City
- Region served: Mexico
- President: Mark Webber
- Affiliations: World Universities Debating Council World Universities Debating Championship in Spanish

The Asociación Mexicana de Debate (Mexican Debate Association; abbreviated AMD) is the regulating body for debate in Mexico, formed by students, former students and debate coaches with experience at the most important debating competitions in the world, such as the World Universities Debating Championship, the World Universities Debating Championship in Spanish and the World Schools Debating Championship, and it is the only body that organizes British Parliamentary, Karl Popper and World Schools debate competitions in the country, including two national championships (one in Spanish and one in English). AMD has the objective of spreading debate all around the country.

They hosted the 2018 and 38th World Universities Debating Championship, and the 2020 World Schools Debating Championship.

== History ==
The Mexican Debate league started with high school debate as the English Speaking Union (ESU) - Mexico had started sponsoring teams to go to the World Schools Debating Championships in 2007 but did not have a league established in Mexico at the time. The league was started in 2010 and the first tournament was hosted at the American School Foundation D.F. The teams attending were ASF, Tec de Monterrey CSF, Edron Academy and Churchill School and College. The Tec de Monterresy CSF hosted the second tournament that school year in 2011 and regular coaches' meetings and began that year to plan future events.

Mexico continued to attend the World Schools Debating Championships (WSDC) in Scotland and in 2011 broke to the sweet 16 Octafinals round for the first time ever that year and has attended every WSDC to this date with teams advancing to the elimination rounds many times as well as winning several top speaker awards.

Most of the founding members of AMD started in high school league and went on to debate at the university level around the world and help found AMD.

AMD became the first body that grouped representatives from all the universities in Mexico that practiced British Parliamentary debate. In the absence of intervarsity debating tournaments in Mexico, the first three teams (Tecnológico de Monterrey Campus Estado de México and Campus Santa Fe, and Instituto Tecnológico Autónomo de México) used to only compete at the World Championships in English and Spanish, as well as two tournaments that were organized during the first years (2011–2013). During the 2013 Spanish Worlds (held in Madrid), a team from the Universidad Iberoamericana Campus León became the first non-Mexico City metropolitan area team to be formed and compete, joining Tec CEM.

Later, more teams were started in Mexico, particularly after the Tec de Monterrey Campus Estado de México team hosted the 2014 World Championships in Spanish. By the 2015 edition in Colombia, Mexico already had the largest delegation competing at the championship and the 2015 national ranking included over 20 institutions.

In 2015, the Association was formed to sponsor tournaments nationally, the first ones being the two National Championships: The Spanish-speaking Campeonato Nacional de Debate (CND) and the English-Speaking Mexican Universities Debating Championship (MUDC), as well as a Metropolitan Debate League and three more tournaments in the Valley of Mexico and Morelia. That same year, the Association organized practices among the Mexican teams that would compete at the 2016 WUDC.

During early 2016, the Association officially announced its plans to host the 2018 World Universities Debating Championship, in Mexico City, and in April they were voted as hosts on a near-unanimous decision, with what they have labeled as what would be the largest debating tournament ever made.

During March 2016, Tec de Monterrey Campus Estado de México became the inaugural Mexican team to win a British Parliamentary tournament abroad, by winning the Spanish Division of the Pan American Universities Debating Championship Jamaica 2016.

== Tournaments ==
AMD nationally and internationally sanctions several official championship tournaments, including:

- Campeonato Nacional de Debate (Spanish-speaking Nationals)
- Mexican Universities Debating Championship (English-speaking Nationals)
- World Universities Debating Championship (with other national debate organizations)
- World Universities Debating Championship in Spanish (with other national debate organizations)
- Pan American Universities Debating Championship (with other national debate organizations)

The National Championships also include a public speaking competition and a Masters tournament, open to judges and the adjudication team, as well as Novice Awards. The Masters tournament can be held on a different format

All of these universities use the British Parliamentary debate format. AMD has also sponsored tournaments such as the Tec de Monterrey Campus Estado de México, Campus Santa Fe, and Campus Morelia, as well as a Metropolitan Debate League, contested by the teams from the Mexico City Metropolitan area, which is pits various teams from each debate society to debate against each other each week, with the number of "match" victories determining the championship, followed by "debate wins" and "debate points".

In addition, AMD has a National ranking that crowns the overall national university champion.

== National Team Champions ==
Year	Champions	Runner-up	Third place
2015	ITAM	Tec de Monterrey Campus Morelia	Tec de Monterrey Campus Estado de México

== National Championship (Spanish) ==
Year	Host	Champions	Team	Finalists	Top Debater	Team	Public Speaking Champion	Team
2016	Universidad de Guadalajara	TBD	TBD	TBD	TBD	TBD	TBD	
2015	Tec de Monterrey Campus Estado de México	Carlos Ortega & Sebastián Alatorre	ITAM	Tec de Monterrey Campus Morelia, ITAM (x2)	María Ballesteros	ITAM	Diego Javier Carreño López	Universidad Autónoma Benito Juárez de Oaxaca

== Masters National Championship (Spanish) ==
Year	Host	Champions	Runner-up
2016	Universidad de Guadalajara	TBD	TBD
2015	Tec de Monterrey Campus Estado de México	Cristina Carrasco & Alberto Gutiérrez	David Alatorre López and Guillermo Tamayo Romero

== Mexican Universities Debating Championship ==
Year	Host	Champions	Team	Finalists	Top Debater	Team	Public Speaking Champion	Team
2015	Tec de Monterrey Campus Estado de México	Nicholas Ferezin & Montserrat Legorreta	Tec de Monterrey Campus Santa Fe	Tec de Monterrey Campus Estado de México (x2), ITAM	Nicholas Ferezin	Tec de Monterrey Campus Santa Fe	Guillermo Tamayo Romero	Tec de Monterrey Campus Estado de México

== Masters National Championship (English) ==
Year	Host	Champions	Runner-up
2015	Tec de Monterrey Campus Estado de México	Mark Webber, Adrián Tame and Alejandra Sánchez	David Alatorre López, Rodolfo Flores Méndez and César Rivas

== Metropolitan Debate League ==
Year	Champion	Runner-up	Third place
2015	Tec de Monterrey Campus Estado de México	ITAM	Escuela Libre de Derecho

== Related ==
- (United Kingdom) : Cambridge Union Society
- (United Kingdom) : Oxford Union Society
- (United Kingdom) : The Durham Union Society
- (United States) : Yale Debate Association
