= Citizens' Initiative Review =

Panel of citizens that summarizes ballot initiatives

A Citizens' Initiative Review (CIR) is a small, relatively representative panel that deliberates on a ballot initiative or referendum to be decided in an upcoming election in order to produce a useful (typically one-page) summary for voters.

== Process ==
The panelists are chosen through means such as random sampling and stratified sampling to be demographically representative. This often involves paying for the time and travel of the roughly two dozen participants. While not quite a citizens' assembly according to John Rountree and Nicole Curato, they note it shares many of the same characteristics.

A trained moderator oversees the discussions. Over a few days, panelists deliberate among themselves and question experts and advocates on all sides of the initiative. The panelists write a statement in a form that can be made available by including it in the voter's pamphlet or guide. This statement summarizes the best arguments, pros, and cons and lists the number of panelists who recommended voting for and against the initiative.

== Purpose ==
A Citizens' Initiative Review aims to strengthen the quality and impact of the public voice in elections and government decisions. It helps to fill an information gap when much of the discourse might come from advertisements or spokespersons from a campaign. Under a CIR, voters are sent a one-pager of citizens' findings about facts as well as pros and cons about the proposed initiative after careful study and deliberation. Vote tallies of the participants' final position on the issue have fallen out of favor given the groups often aren't large enough to be statistically significant.

== Evaluation ==
Academic research reported that CIR panelists achieved high-quality deliberation. Voters became aware of those deliberations through voters' pamphlets and found the statement to be helpful to their decisions, and voter knowledge about the initiatives increased. The panelists themselves developed new attitudes about the political process and their capabilities.

== In practice ==
The state of Oregon created the first permanent Citizens' Initiative Review in 2010, while pilots have been run in places including Colorado, Arizona, Massachusetts, Sion (Switzerland) and Finland. Funding has not been permanently allocated in Oregon, so the application has been limited to one ballot measure on the years when funding has been provided.

== See also ==
- Deliberative democracy
- Direct democracy
- Sortition
