= All-Asian Intervarsity Debating Championships =

Annual university debating tournament

The All-Asian Intervarsity Debating Championships was an annual debating tournament for teams from universities in Asia.
