= Rajalakshmi Engineering College =

Private college in Tamil Nadu, India

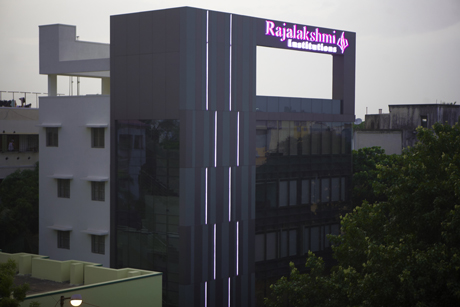
- Rajalakshmi Engineering College campus
- Motto: Hard Work And Discipline
- Type: Private
- Established: 1997
- Students: 2000 (Average intake per year UG: 1500, PG: 500)
- Location: Chennai, Tamil Nadu, India
- Campus: 23 acres
- Website: www.rajalakshmi.org

Rajalakshmi Engineering College is a private engineering college located at Thandalam, Sriperumbudur near Chennai, Tamil Nadu, India. The college was established in 1997 by the Rajalakshmi Educational Trust and is part of the Rajalakshmi Institutions. At its 24th graduation ceremony on August 24, 2025, Rajalakshmi Engineering College awarded degrees to approximately 1,720 students.

== Accreditations ==
It is approved and accredited by the National Board of Accreditation (NBA)

The college is also accredited by companies like Tata Consultancy Services, Cognizant Technology Solutions, WIPRO Trusted Academic Partner and Infosys Campus Connect. Ashok Leyland recognized the college as a centre of excellence in automotives. IBM named it a "Centre of Excellence for Certified Software Center".

== Cooperation with other organisations ==
It has memoranda of understanding with the following industry representatives:

- Robert Bosch GmbH to set up a joint certification training centre.
- Aban Group focusing on biofuel from algae.

Rajalakshmi Education Private Limited has entered into an agreement with University of Worcester to jointly offer courses in computing and management.

REC sponsored the Aircel Chennai Open from 2012.

== Facilities ==
The REC library has a collection of 48,100 volumes and periodicals.

=== Transport ===
Since the campus is located 35 kilometres (22 mi) away from Chennai city, transportation is provided between Chennai and the college. The college now runs over 119 air-conditioned buses.

== Conferences and symposia ==
In 2013, REC organised an international conference on surface engineering for research and industrial applications, Interfinish SERIA 2013 Asia Pacific.

== Rankings ==
University and college rankings

General – India
- NIRF (Overall) (2024): 151-200

Engineering – India
- NIRF (2024): 101-150

The National Institutional Ranking Framework (NIRF) ranked it between 101-150 among engineering colleges and 151-200 overall in 2024.

== Societies and extracurricular activities ==
- NSS (a community service initiative)

=== KRIYA ===
KRIYA is an "entrepreneurship development cell" with the stated aim of conducting research, inspiring students, assist with project development and provide interaction with entrepreneurs and industrialists. The facility is designed by students.

=== Alumni association ===
Some alumni have achieved a degree of international recognition.
