= Andrew Stewart Coats =

Australian–British academic cardiologist (born 1958)

Andrew Stewart Coats AO
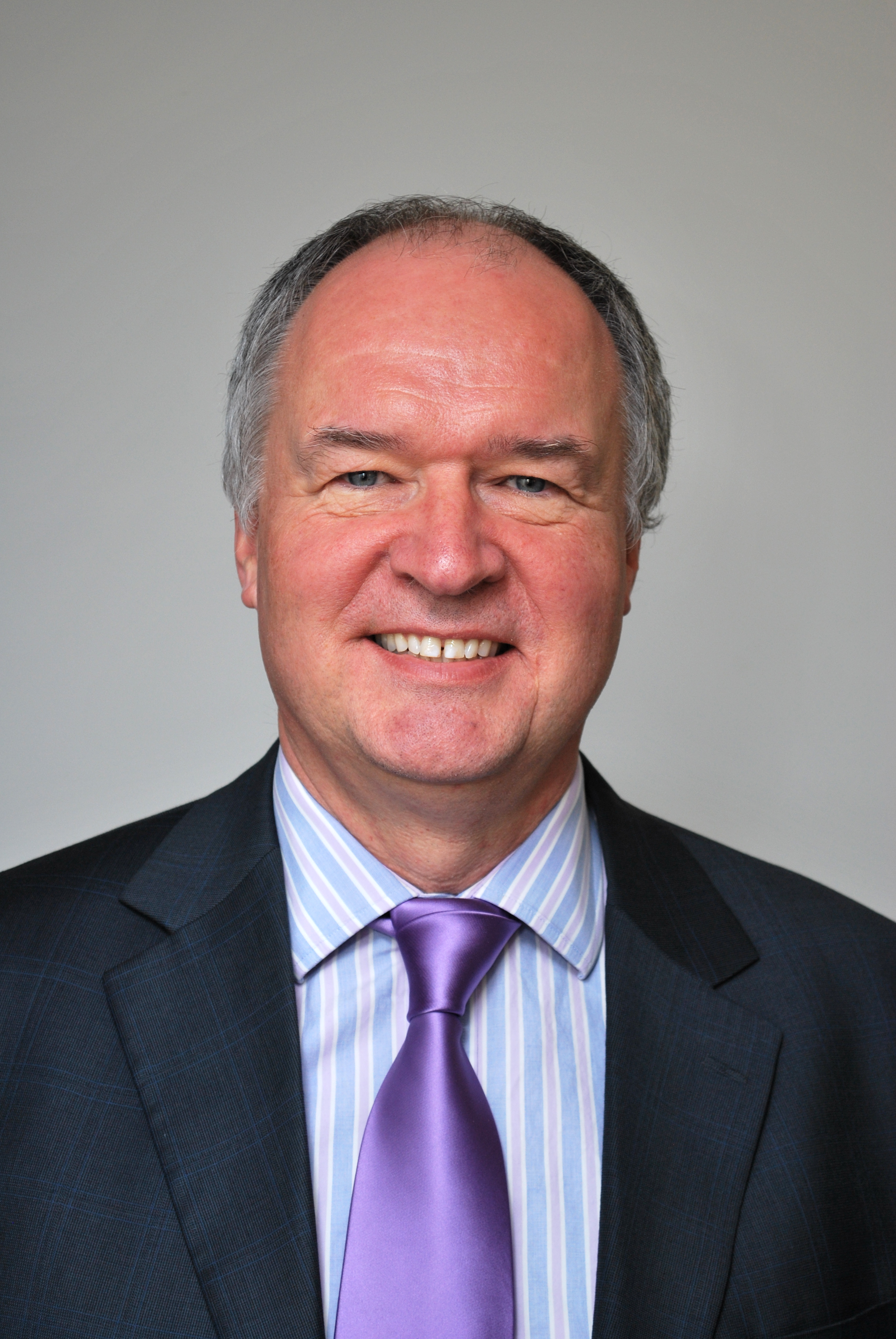
- Andrew Stewart Coats, ca. 2010
- Born: Andrew Justin Stewart Coats; 1 February 1958 (age 68); Melbourne, Australia
- Education: University of Oxford; Cambridge University; London Business School
- Known for: Chronic heart failure research
- Medical career
- Profession: Academic senior university administrator
- Institutions: University of Oxford; Royal Brompton Hospital of Imperial College London; University of Sydney; Norwich Research Park; University of Warwick; Monash University
- Sub-specialties: Cardiology
- Awards: Linacre Medal (1998); Michael L Pollock Award (1999)

Andrew Justin Stewart Coats AO (born 1 February 1958) is an Australian–British academic cardiologist who has particular interest in the management of heart failure. His research suggested exercise training (rather than bed rest) as a more effective treatment for chronic heart failure. He is known for putting forward the "muscle hypothesis" of heart failure. In addition to this, Coats is a fundraiser, university administrator, and inventor. His Imperial College patents have formed the basis of companies specialising in the treatment of cachexia (Myotec and PsiOxus).

== Early life and education ==
Andrew Stewart Coats was born and raised in Melbourne. His father, Douglas A. Coats, was a Professor of Resuscitation who first described essential fatty acids.

Stewart Coats was educated at Melbourne Grammar School, where he was proxime accessit Head of School and a School Officer; St Catherine's College, Oxford, where he graduated with a B.A. in Physiological Sciences with First-Class Honours and won the Rose Prize; and Clare College, Cambridge, where he read medicine, earning a M.B. B.Chir., and was top of his year with two distinctions.

== Career ==
=== Medical career ===
After qualifying in medicine in 1980, Stewart Coats started his career at St Vincent's Hospital, Melbourne under Professor David Penington and then at the University of Oxford under Professor Peter Sleight. In 1991, he was appointed Senior Lecturer, supported by the British Heart Foundation, at the National Heart and Lung Institute [NHLI] under Professor Philip Poole-Wilson.

In 1996, he was appointed the Viscount Royston Professor of Cardiology at Imperial College. He was also honorary consultant physician at the Royal Brompton Hospital in London, and its Clinical Director for Cardiology and its Associate Medical Director. In 2002, Stewart Coats became the 17th Dean of the Faculty of Medicine at the University of Sydney. In 2006, he was appointed Deputy Vice-Chancellor (External Communications) of the University of Sydney. In 2009, Stewart Coats was appointed the second Norwich Research Park Professor-at-Large, second to Baron Solly Zuckerman. In 2011, Stewart Coats was appointed chief executive officer of the Norwich Research Park. In 2013, he took up the position of Joint Academic Vice-President of Monash University, Australia and the University of Warwick, UK.

=== Research career ===
Stewart Coats commenced his research career in hypertension, where he did some of the early work on the clinical value of 24-hour ambulatory blood pressure monitoring. His subsequent career, forming the bulk of his more than 550 research papers, has been in the field of heart failure where he conducted the first ever randomised trial of exercise training in chronic heart failure.

He coined the term "The Muscle Hypothesis", the now accepted explanation for the generation of exercise-limiting symptoms in chronic heart failure, but at the time a radical theory.

He has been chairman or a member of the steering committee of many large-scale international drug trials that have influenced treatment of cardiovascular disease. These include the Carvedilol Prospective Randomized Cumulative Survival (COPERNICUS) Trial, OPTIMAAL (angiotensin receptor antagonist in heart failure), and SENIORS (management of heart failure in the elderly).

He has published over 450 items on PubMed as of February 2011 and has been Editor-in-Chief of the International Journal of Cardiology since 1999.

In 2016, he was the keynote speaker at the International Conference of Undergraduate Research, held concurrently in Australia, the UK, Singapore, Malaysia, Japan, South Africa and the US.

=== National and international work ===
Stewart Coats was appointed chair of Australia's peak policy body for Health Informatics, the Australian Health Information Council (AHIC). He sat on many committees and chaired the New South Wales Ministerial Advisory Committee on Health and Medical Research (MACMHR). In his three years as Deputy Vice-Chancellor in charge of External Relations and Development at Sydney, the university achieved the highest ever fund-raising total for any Australian university, in excess of A$50 million per year.

=== Commercial career ===
Stewart Coats completed an MBA at London Business School and subsequently became a Fellow of the Australian Institute of Company Directors and a member of London's Institute of Directors. He has also been a board director of a number of private and public companies, including Myotec, PsiOxus, Lone Star Heart Inc., Centenary Institute, the Heart Research Institute, Cardiodirect (UK) Limited, the Woolcock Institute of Medical Research, and the George Institute of International Health.

== Personal life ==
Stewart Coats has two brothers, one of whom, Peter, works for Minter Ellison in Melbourne. Peter has previously been the firm's managing partner over a number of years, specialising in asbestos litigation, coronial inquests, liability claims and occupational health and safety prosecutions, and insurance law and is a graduate of the Melbourne Law School (LL.B.) and University of Melbourne (B.A.).

In 2017 Stewart Coats was appointed an Officer of the Order of Australia for distinguished service to medical research and tertiary education in the field of cardiology, as an academic and author, and as a mentor and role model for young scientists.

== Awards ==
- Linacre Medal of the Royal College of Physicians (1998)
- The Inaugural Michael L Pollock Award, American Heart Association (1999)
