= National Schools Debating Championship =

Australian high school debate tournament

The National Schools Debating Championship (NSDC) is the most prestigious high school debating tournament in Australia, and one of the most prestigious debating tournaments in the world. The Championships have been held annually since 1971 and the hosts rotate between states and territories. The championships also double as the selection process for the Australian Schools Debating Team, which compete at the World Schools Debating Championship. NSDC 2027 is set to take place in Perth.

== Format ==
NSDC uses the World Schools Debating Championship format, which is a variation of Australian-Asia Debating and Parliamentary Debate formats. It is a 3v3 format, consisting of three 8-minute speeches, and a 4-minute reply speech from each side. Points of information can be asked between the first and seventh minute of any speech besides the reply speeches. Each state’s and territory’s affiliate body sends one team of high school students; 4 speakers and several more reserve speakers (number at the discretion of the affiliate), for a total of 8 teams.

The competition starts with 7 preliminary rounds in a single round-robin. The top four teams then progress to the outrounds, with a double elimination for 1st and 2nd and single elimination for 3rd and 4th. The 1st and 2nd team compete in the major semifinals, whilst the 3rd and 4th team compete in the minor semifinals. The winner of the major semifinal would proceed to the grand final, whilst the loser of the major semifinals and winner of the minor semifinal would compete against each other in the preliminary finals. The winner of the preliminary finals would then compete against the winner of the major semifinals in the grandfinals.

Each debate in the preliminary rounds is judged by 3 adjudicators. The major and minor semi finals also have 3 adjudicators; there is 5 adjudicators for the preliminary final and 7 adjudicators for the grand final.

== Past champions ==
Past Champion States
Year	Host city	Champions	Students
2026	Brisbane	Queensland	Elissa Sio, Liam McLeod, Leonard Cavallaro, Grace Zhao
2025	Sydney	NSW	Maya Garg, Harry Tong, Kitty He, Summer Chen
2024	Adelaide	Victoria	Alice Liberman, Bianca Chung, Jenny Gong, Nicholas Bogdan
2023	Melbourne	South Australia	Devika Mukherjee, Max Thomas, Phoebe Chalmers, Thomas Henchliffe
2022	Canberra	Queensland	Zoë Fraser, Thomas Musgrave, Thomas Nunn-Rutledge, Harry Rae
2021	Hobart	Victoria	Hamish Bruce, Max Fan, Erin Kim, Livia Tropea
2020	[Online]	NSW	Brendon Chen, Jinyoung Kim, Ally Pitt, Bennett Roebuck-Krautz
2019	Darwin	NSW	Laura Charlton, Ally Pitt, James Price, Anna-Sophia Zahar
2018	Perth	NSW	Alex De Araujo, Indigo Crosweller, Sophie Shead, Daniel Yim
2017	Brisbane	NSW	Ella Finlay, Isabella Monardo, Elinor Stephenson, Daniel Yim
2016	Sydney	Queensland	Callum Dargavel, Tristan Hurree, Isabel Nolan, Xavier Redmond
2015	Adelaide	NSW	Eden Blair, Imogen Harper, Thomas Shortridge, Sam Wolfe
2014	Melbourne	NSW	Imogen Harper, Sophie Large, Seb Rees, James Stratton
2013	Canberra	NSW	Gabriel Bowes-Whitton, Fiona Lin, Harry Rogers, James Stratton
2012	Hobart	Victoria	Tyrone Connell, John Hajek, Annie Williamson, Ronald Zhang
2011	Perth	NSW	Emma Johnson, Bo Seo, Harry Stratton, Evie Woodford
