= Australia–Asia debating =

Form of academic debate

Australia–Asia Debate, sometimes referred to as Australasian Debating or Australs Style, is a form of academic debate. In the past few years, this style of debating has increased in usage dramatically throughout Australia and New Zealand as well as the broader Asian region, but in the case of Asian countries including Singapore, Malaysia, and the Philippines, the format is also used alongside the British Parliamentary Format. The context in which the Australia-Asia style of debate is used varies, but it is commonly used in Australia at the primary and secondary school level, ranging from small informal one-off intra-school debates to larger more formal inter-school competitions with several rounds and a finals series which occur over a year. It is also commonly used at university level.

== Content ==
Australia-Asia style debates consist of two teams who debate over an issue, more commonly called a topic (or proposition at WSDC level). The issue, by convention, is presented in the form of an affirmative statement beginning with "That", for example, "That cats are better than dogs," or "This House," for example "This House would establish a world government." The subject of topics can vary from region to region.

The two teams in Australia–Asia debating are called the "Affirmative" and the "Negative". Each team refers to the other team as the "Opposition". The affirmative team agrees with the topic and presents arguments to demonstrate the truth of the topic. The negative team disagrees with the topic and presents arguments to disprove the truth of the topic. Each team must convince the adjudicator(s) (judge(s)) that their side of the topic is correct and that their opposition's is incorrect. Depending on the context in which a debate is being presented it may be appropriate for the audience to decide the winner of the debate. However, in formal debating, the adjudicator is responsible for deciding the winner of the debate.

== Speeches ==
Each team comprises three members, each of whom is named according to their team and speaking position within their team.

Each of the six speakers (three affirmative and three negative) speak in succession, beginning with the first affirmative speaker. The speaking order is therefore as follows:

first affirmative, first negative, second affirmative, second negative, third affirmative, and finally third negative.

At the National Schools Debating Championship (NSDC) and Australasian Intervarsity Debating Championships (Australs), fourth (reply) speakers are also commonplace. They speak for four minutes, with the negative reply speaker going first; a reply speaker must also be the team's first or second speaker. Points of information cannot be offered at reply.

Each speaker has a set speaking time according to the rules agreed to by both teams. In formal debate contexts, such as school debating competitions in Australia, the speaking time is proportional to the school Year Level division that a team is competing in. For example, Year 6 debaters may have a speaking time of ~3 minutes, while Year 11 and 12 debaters usually speak for 8 minutes. There is no universally adopted speaking time.

The adjudicator will usually ring a bell one or two minutes before the speaker's time expires as a first warning (such as at 6 minutes in an eight-minute speech). A second warning is then given at the end of the allotted time, signalling that the debater ought to conclude as soon as possible (in many Australian schools, failure to conclude at this point will cause the speaker to lose points). Sometimes the second warning will be a double bell so as to distinguish between the first and second warnings. Some competition rules specify that a speaker must complete their speech within 30 seconds either side of the final bell, the warning bell acting only as a warning and not as an indicator that a speaker must stop speaking.

Short interjections which can be questions, comments, or statements are called Points of Information. They are allowed between the first minute and the sixth minute of the speech, but the points of information are not allowed during the reply speech. When a team is delivering speech, the other team can do the point of information by standing up and exclaiming a short interjection. The speaker can decide to accept or reject it. If it is accepted, the point of information can be said. Otherwise, the person making the points of information must sit down. Not all competitions include Points of Information, such as the Debating Association of Victoria's Schools competition.

Under some rules, a 'reply speech' will be able to be made by one of the speakers after all speakers have spoken. The negative team will usually be allowed to make their reply speech first. Often, only the first or second speaker of a team is allowed to make the reply speech. Points for the reply speeches are worth only half of points scored in the substantive speeches.

=== Order of delivering speech ===
1. First affirmative speaker
2. First negative speaker
3. Second affirmative speaker
4. Second negative speaker
5. Third affirmative speaker
6. Third negative speaker
7. Negative reply speaker (speech must be given by either first or second negative speaker)
8. Affirmative reply speaker (speech must be given by either first or second affirmative speaker)

== Speakers' roles ==
First speakers should first give a brief introduction, contextualising the debate, and perhaps exploring the basic philosophical questions raised by the topic. Ordinarily, the first affirmative speaker would then explain the affirmative team's 'model', or 'mechanism'. It is not enough for a team simply to argue that they should implement some policy; they must also explain to us how the policy is going to be implemented. That explanation is the 'model'. The first negative speaker can also use a 'model', often called a 'counter-model', but would only do so in particular circumstances, such as when the model given is unreasonable. The first negative speaker should always make some points in rebuttal at this stage of the speech. However, such rebuttal should be kept short. The first speaker, whether affirmative or negative, should then outline the 'team split', that is, what each of the team's speakers will be discussing. This is very important, as it helps to guide the adjudicator. The first speaker should then proceed to make substantive arguments in favour of their position. The first speaker generally argues the strongest points.

The second speaker's role is both to refute the main arguments of the opposing first speaker, and to further advance their own team's case. New arguments should be introduced by the second speaker. The second speaker should spend about half of the speech rebutting the opposing team, and half advancing their own case.

The third speaker's role is to refute the opposing team's case, and to conclude and summarise their own team's case. The third speaker cannot make 'new' arguments in favour of their position or bring up new content. The goal of the third speaker should not be simply to pick out technical and practical flaws in the opposing team's case, but to undermine the deepest, most basic philosophical premises of the opposing team's argument. As well as use substantive from their previous speakers to further rebut.

Reply speakers should speak as if they are adjudicators passing judgment on the debate, although of course always looking favourably on their own side.

== Scoring ==
In formal debating contexts speakers are scored according to three categories: Matter, Manner and Method. Matter is the category that assesses the content of a speaker's speech which includes the arguments and evidence that they present to support their team's side of the topic. Manner is the category that assesses the way in which a speaker presents their material and usually includes factors such as eye contact, gesturing and voice projection. Method is category that assesses the way in which a speaker structures their speech and includes factors such as dynamics (the way that a speaker responds to their opposition's strategy) and rebuttal. The specific assessment criteria of Matter, Manner and Method depends on the rules under which the debate is conducted. The score ranges that are used to score Matter, Manner and Method, again vary. Generally speaking the entire speech is scored out of a total of 100 points, with 40 points allocated to Matter and Manner respectively and 20 points allocated to Method. To allow consistency in scoring some programs have adopted another system derived from the 100 point system. This other system reduces the range of scores. Both Matter and Manner are reduced from 40 points to 32 points, with a minimum score of 28 points respectively. Method is reduced from 20 points to 16 points, with a minimum of 14 points. Thus the score range is 70 points to 80 points with an average of 75 points. Since there are three speakers on each team the team's score can range from 210 points to 240 points with an average of 225 points. The team that is victorious in a debate has a higher team score than their opposition.

In the event that there are several rounds, teams generally are given a preparation time ranging from several weeks to half an hour. Debates where teams have less than a day to prepare are called Short Preparation or Impromptu debates. In these particular formats teams are usually restricted in the material that they have access to, like restricted use of technology. In the event of restricted materials the speaking times may be shortened. Impromptu debates are used in some programs as several debates are held on the same day, while others where rounds are held on different days over a longer period of time have Impromptu debates in one or more of the rounds to complement the prepared debates. Some programs call the day on which several debating rounds are held "Gala Day".

== Variations ==
There are a number of variations to the Australia–Asia style of debating. One variation is that there are four members on each team, the fourth member acting as an adviser to the other three. Another variation is that one of the three speakers in each team speaks an additional time after the Third Negative speaker. This is known as the Reply-Speaker format of debate. The order in which the additional speakers speak is dependent on the specific rules that the Affirmative and Negative Teams have agreed to debate under. Another variation used by The Australasian Intervarsity Debating Association is the Affirmative Action requirement, whereby the top three teams from each university must have at least three female members and one third of the entire contingent must be female.

Another variation used at university level debates is the 'secret topic' or 'short-preparation' debate, where debate topics and sides are allocated only an hour before the debate. This format is primarily used at a university level, and is used by SAAUCC for intercollege debates. It is, however, also used in some high school-level debates, such as in the New South Wales Premier's Debating Challenge, the Sydney ISDA Competition (Independent School's Debating Association), the Western Australian Debating League, the Debating Association of Victoria, and the GPS debating association. For high school-level debates, the prevalence of 'secret topic' debates may become more frequent for older students, such as in the Debating Association of Victoria, where D Grade (Year 9) students do not participate in 'secret topic' debates, while they comprise the majority of a debate season for A Grade (Year 12) students.

== See also ==
- Debate
- Australasian Intervarsity Debating Championships
