= United Asian Debating Championships =

Annual debate tournament

The United Asian Debating Championship (UADC) is an annual debating tournament for teams from universities in Asia. It is the largest inter-varsity Parliamentary Debate tournament in Asia, with over 600 participants. The UADC holds debates in the Asian 3-on-3 format of Parliamentary Debating. The 1st UADC was hosted by Assumption University, Bangkok in 2010.

The UADC was created after a decision to merge the two separate championships that were held after the Asian Debating community split in 2005 - the Asian Universities Debating Championship (AUDC) and the All-Asian Intervarsity Debating Championships (AIDC or "All-Asians"). The decision to unite the two competing tournaments, and thus, create a single debate championship for Asia was taken at the last Asian Universities Debating Championships in 2009.

== Origin ==
Arising out of a unification of the Asian Universities Debating Championship as well as the All-Asian Intervarsity Debating Championships, UADC represents the results of efforts to bridge the schism that emerged in Asian debating.

Institutions who were unhappy about aspects of the organisation of the All-Asian Intervarsity Debating Championships established the Asian Universities Debating Championship in 2005 as an alternative to the All-Asians Championship. Since then, many universities in Asia with strong debating traditions – most notably universities from the Philippines and Singapore, including all except one of the institutions who won the All-Asian championships up to 2004 – had chosen not to participate in the All-Asian Intervarsity Championships and have instead entered teams in the Asian Universities Debating Championship.

While not necessarily intended to be a rival tournament, the last three AUDCs coincided with the schedule of the All-Asian Championship, which made it impractical for teams to attend both tournaments.

After many overtures, including a proposal to have an Asian Unity Tournament in Multimedia University, Malaysia, which was not accepted by the AUDC Council, it was agreed that the All-Asian Universities would attend the AUDC Championships held in 2009 in Dhaka hosted by East West University. It was decided here in Council that the two tournaments would unite in the next edition, and the name of this new tournament would be the United Asian Debating Championships.

== The Union ==
The Union that decided the unification was chaired by Estelle Osorio from De La Salle University. The next chair, Vikram Balasubramanian of Nanyang Technological University of Singapore, was elected in the same union meeting.

The 1st United Asians Debate Championship was hosted by Assumption University, Thailand. Dino de Leon of De La Salle University chaired the Union meetings as acting chair. Sharmila Parmanand of Ateneo de Manila University was elected as the chair for year 2010–2011.

== Format of the event ==
The UADC, like the AUDC and the All-Asians, is held annually in May, but was later transferred in June due to the academic calendar change. The competition involves eight preliminary rounds, which become power-paired as the tournament progresses, matching the strongest-performing teams against each other.

The preliminary rounds are followed by a "break" announcement, at which the teams proceeding to elimination rounds are announced. Separate breaks are announced for English as Foreign language (EFL) team competition. 16 teams proceed to octo-finals. While preliminary rounds are usually judged by up to three judges, break rounds are judged by panels of five or seven, and the finals by a panel of nine.

Due to the COVID-19 outbreak, the 2020 edition of UADC was the first ever Digital UADC, it was hosted by the Bangladesh Debating Council with the support of Independent University Bangladesh & Institute of Business Administration, University of Dhaka.

== Past tournaments ==
Year	Champions	Runners-up	EFL Winners	Hosts
2026	(India) Indira Gandhi National Open University	(Japan) University of Tokyo	(Bangladesh) Islamic University for Technology	(Singapore) EduDrift
2025	National University of Singapore	National University of Singapore	Bangladesh University of Professionals	(Singapore) EduDrift
2024	(Singapore) Nanyang Technological University	University of the Philippines Diliman	Macau University of Science and Technology	(Malaysia) Malaysian Institute for Debate and Public Speaking and Berjaya University College
2023	(Philippines) Ateneo de Manila University	(Philippines) Ateneo de Manila University	(Korea) Hankuk University of Foreign Studies	(Malaysia) Intertext Education
2022	(Philippines) Ateneo de Manila University	(Nepal) Tribhuvan University	(China) Peking University	(Malaysia) Malaysian Institute for Debate and Public Speaking and Taylor's University
2021	(Malaysia) University of Malaya	(Japan) University of Tokyo	(Korea) Hankuk University of Foreign Studies	(Singapore) EduDrift
2020	(Philippines) Ateneo de Manila University	(Malaysia) Taylor's University	(Indonesia) Institut Teknologi Bandung	Institute of Business Administration, University of Dhaka and Independent University, Bangladesh
2019	(Philippines) Ateneo de Manila University	(Bangladesh) Institute of Business Administration, University of Dhaka	(Indonesia) Binus University	Vinschool and Vietnam National University, Hanoi - International School
2018	Independent University, Bangladesh	(Bangladesh) Institute of Business Administration, University of Dhaka	(Indonesia) Binus University	(Indonesia) Institut Teknologi Bandung
2017	National University of Singapore	(Philippines) Ateneo de Manila University	(Indonesia) Institut Teknologi Bandung	SpringBoard4Cambodia
2016	International Islamic University Malaysia	(Malaysia) Universiti Teknologi MARA	(Indonesia) Universitas Gadjah Mada	(Thailand) Assumption University
2015	International Islamic University Malaysia	(Malaysia) Universiti Teknologi MARA	(Indonesia) Universitas Gadjah Mada	(Indonesia) Udayana University and Bina Nusantara University
2014	(Singapore) Nanyang Technological University	International Islamic University Malaysia	(Indonesia) Universitas Gadjah Mada	(Singapore) Nanyang Technological University
2013	University of the Philippines Diliman	National University of Singapore	(Indonesia) Institut Teknologi Bandung	University of the Philippines Diliman and Ateneo de Manila University
2012	(Singapore) Nanyang Technological University	(Philippines) Ateneo de Manila University	(Indonesia) Bina Nusantara University	(Malaysia) Multimedia University
2011	National University of Singapore	University of the Philippines Diliman	(Indonesia) Bakrie University	(Macau) University of Macao
2010	(Philippines) Ateneo de Manila University	(Singapore) Nanyang Technological University	(Indonesia) Institut Teknologi Bandung	(Thailand) Assumption University

== Best speakers ==
Year	Speaker	University
2026	Krishaang Kohli	Indira Gandhi National Open University (India)
2025	Cavan Tay	National University of Singapore (Singapore)
2024	Ian Dylan Chai	National University of Singapore (Singapore)
2023	Mikko Vitug	Ateneo de Manila University (Philippines)
2022	David Demitri Africa	Ateneo de Manila University (Philippines)
2021	Irene Dela Cruz	Ateneo de Manila University (Philippines)
2020	Kanan Ishizaka, Sajid Khandaker	University of Tokyo (Japan), Institute of Business Administration, University of Dhaka (Bangladesh)
2019	Mikaela Filoteo	Ateneo de Manila University (Philippines)
2018	Mikaela Filoteo and Katrina Chan	Ateneo de Manila University (Philippines)
2017	Andrei Buendia, Sajid Khandaker	Ateneo de Manila University (Philippines), Institute of Business Administration, University of Dhaka (Bangladesh)
2016	Mubarrat Wassey	International Islamic University Malaysia (Malaysia)
2015	Syed Saddiq	International Islamic University Malaysia (Malaysia)
2014	Mai Mokhsein	Universiti Teknologi MARA (Malaysia)
2013	Imran Rahim	National University of Singapore (Singapore)
2012	Pearl Simbulan	University of the Philippines Diliman (Philippines)
2011	Imran Rahim	National University of Singapore (Singapore)

== Future tournaments ==
- 2020 – Online from Bangladesh
