= Thandalam, Chennai =

Thandalam
- Village
- Locmapation in Tamil Nadu, India Thandalam (India)
- Coordinates: 13°1′0.81″N 80°0′24.86″E
- Country: India
- State: Tamil Nadu
- District: Kancheepuram
- Taluk: Sriperumbudur
- Metro: Chennai

Government
  - Type: Panchayati raj (India)
  - Body: Gram panchayat

Languages
  - Official: Tamil
- Time zone: UTC+5:30 (IST)
- PIN: 602101
- Vehicle registration: TN-85
- Website: tnmaps.tn.nic.in

Thandalam is an emerging location of the Chennai city in the Sriperumbudur taluk of Kancheepuram district, Tamil Nadu, India. It is in the National Highway 4 (NH-4) or State Highway 84 (SH-84) at Sira Bypass. It is the village near the Chembarambakkam lake. The village is the birthplace of Tamil Thendral Thiru. V. Kalyanasundaram
