= British Parliamentary Style =

Style of competitive debate

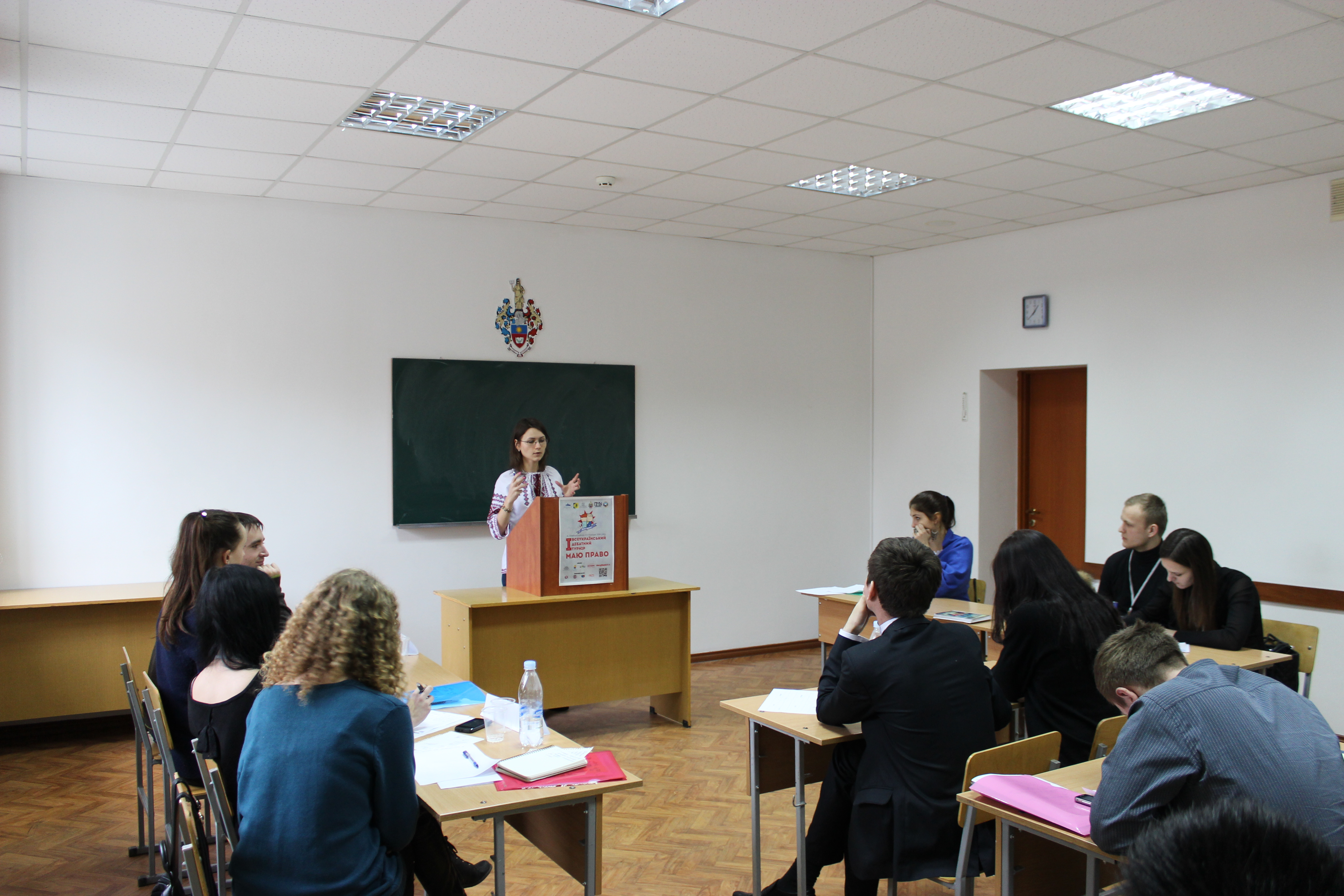
Debating in Khmelnytskyi, Ukraine. The Deputy Leader of the Opposition is speaking.

British Parliamentary style is a major form of academic debate that originated in Liverpool in the mid 1800s. It has gained wide support globally and is the official format of the World Universities Debating Championship (WUDC).

== Rules ==
British Parliamentary debates consist of four teams, containing two speakers each, which are divided into two sides that speak for and against the motion. Due to the style's origins in British parliamentary procedure, the two sides are called the Government and the Opposition. Similarly, sides are known as benches, consisting of two teams - an opening team and a closing team. Teams compete against all three other teams in the round, including against its own opening or closing team, which it is not expected to help. The order of speeches alternates between the two benches, starting with the first government speaker, until all eight participants have spoken. Speeches are usually either five (secondary school level) or seven (university level) minutes in duration.

=== Prime Minister/Leader of the Opposition ===
The first speaker from each bench is known as the PM/LO. They are responsible for defining the key terminologies, explaining the background or status quo and establishing the characterisation of the motion, particularly within policy motions, under which the debate will take place, along with forwarding arguments and their importance for their own teams (Opening Government or Opening Opposition).

=== Deputy speeches ===
The second speaker from each bench is known as the Deputy. Deputies may add new arguments to their team's substantive argument, but their primary responsibilities are to consolidate and rebuild the existing case, to launch responses to the opposing bench, and to add additional weighing to their arguments to preemptively frame them against any extensions/new arguments from closing.

=== Member/Extension speeches ===
The third speaker from each bench (i.e., the first speaker for the closing sides), is known as the Member. Member speeches cannot contradict what has been said by their opening sides (a.k.a., knifing), unless the opening teams have conceded the debate or misinterpreted the motion. The primary duty of Members is to differentiate their side from their opening, by running either a clear vertical extension, flagging what parts of it are exclusively new, and be analytical for the actualisation of the arguments' benefits, or a horizontal extension and weighing it directly against other arguments in the round. They can run mechanical extensions in which they provide substantial analysis not claimed by their opening bench. They can also provide some brief response to the opening half of the debate as a whole, but this is not their primary goal.

=== Whip speeches ===
The final speaker from each bench is known as the Whip (originates from the term for those responsible for bringing voters to the polls). The primary duty of whip speakers is to note the major disagreement (a.k.a., point of clash) in the debate, and summarise, frame, and weigh the arguments presented in the debate and show that their team (Closing Government or Closing Opposition) wins the debate. Whip speakers can still provide new materials which are based on the arguments made by previous speakers in their own bench (still considered as extension), however, Whip speakers cannot make new arguments which are irrelevant to arguments made in previous speeches.

=== Points of Information ===
Speakers in the BP format can offer Points of Information (POIs) to opposing teams. To offer a POI during another speaker's speech, a debater may stand, say something such as "Point" or "Point of Information", and wait to be called on. The speaker may accept, reject, or ignore the POI. If they accept, the individual who offered the POI may state an argument, a rebuttal, or ask a question to the speaker for up to 15 seconds or until interrupted by the speaker. Speakers may reject POIs with a physical cue (e.g. waving one's hand) or a verbal indication of rejection.

Speakers are granted "protected time", during which no points of information may be offered. Most commonly, this is the first and last minute of a speech. In many competitions, POI's should be offered 15 seconds apart (badgering).

Speakers may be penalised for failing to accept at least one POI in their speech- this is viewed as lack of engagement in the debate occurring.

Only speakers from the opposing bench may offer POIs to the current speaker. Speakers on the same side of the motion cannot do so even if they are from different teams (e.g. Opening and Closing Government may offer POIs to Opening Opposition, but Closing Opposition cannot).

=== Competitions in BP Style ===
The debating season closely follows the academic year in Northern Hemisphere countries. The first competitions are in Britain and Ireland in October and November, traditionally commenced by the Edinburgh Cup in the first week of October, followed by the Cambridge and Oxford Inter-varsities (IVs), all the way up to the World Championships held over the Christmas holidays. After the "Worlds", the Trinity IV in Dublin, the premier tournament in Ireland, recommences the season in the new year. The season continues with a large number of Islands of the North Atlantic (IONA) and European competitions from March to June, including the HWS Round Robin normally held in early April. The European Championship, or Euros were initially held over the Easter break, but is now held over the summer or later in the winter and usually concludes the European debating season.

The world championships, as well as many other tournaments, require team members to be registered students of a university or another tertiary-level institution. However, "open" tournaments also exist that allow non-students and composite teams to compete.

== Competencies in Alternative Languages ==
Currently, the British parliamentary debate model has been widely adopted in various parts of the world, fostering the development of debate circuits in languages other than English. While the World Universities Debating Championship (WUDC) in English remains the most prestigious and largest debate competition globally, other languages have established their own parallel circuits, promoting linguistic diversity in formal debating. As a result, many competitions allow a secondary, "Second Language" final in which teams debating in a second language participate in a separate final, should they qualify for the open break.

The Spanish-language debate circuit stands out as the second-largest in terms of participation and international recognition. The flagship event in this circuit is the Campeonato Mundial Universitario de Debate en Español (CMUDE), which mirrors the WUDC in structure, rules, and format but is conducted entirely in Spanish. CMUDE gathers university debate teams from Spain, Latin America, and Spanish-speaking communities worldwide.

Similar initiatives have also emerged in other languages, such as French, Arabic, and Portuguese, reflecting the growing interest in making debate accessible to non-English speakers. These circuits play a crucial role in developing global citizens who are well-versed in argumentation and public speaking, regardless of their native language.
