= Canadian University Society for Intercollegiate Debate =

Canadian public-speaking governing body

- Formation: 1978; 48 years ago
- Type: Student debating organization
- Location: Canada
- President: Nyx Kucharski; University of Waterloo
- Affiliations: World Universities Debating Council
- Website: www.cusid.ca

The Canadian University Society for Intercollegiate Debate (CUSID) is the national organization which governs all English language competitive university debating and public speaking in Canada. It sanctions several official annual tournaments and represents Canadian debating domestically and abroad. Its membership consists of student debating unions, sanctioned by their respective universities, from across Canada. CUSID has been described as "a student-run, parliamentary debate league with close ties to the American Parliamentary Debate Association". CUSID debaters have gone on to notable careers in law, business, government, and academia, and the presidency of the organization is a highly sought-after position.

== History ==
CUSID was officially founded in 1978, although it held its first annual tournament in 1977. The regular tournaments held under its auspices, such as those at the University of Toronto, McGill University, the University of Western Ontario, Queen's University, and the University of Ottawa predate CUSID's formation by many decades.

The inaugural British Parliamentary National Championship (now known as the Canadian Universities Debating Championship) was hosted in 2004 at the University of Toronto. Unlike other CUSID title tournaments, participants did not need to be a member of a CUSID institution in order to take part.

In 2020, the society was forced to cancel its annual national championship due to the risk presented by COVID-19. However, the National Championship was rescheduled into an online iteration organized by the year's original host institution, the University of Calgary Debate Society. Due to continued pandemic restrictions, the entirety of the 2020–2021 season was also held online.

In 2020 CUSID voted to end the long-standing tradition to not allow hybrid teams (teams representing two different institutions) at several of its events. This aligned with the society's British Parliamentary Championship, which has always allowed such teams.

In 2024, the British Parliamentary National Championship was renamed to the Canadian Universities Debating Championship (CUDC). The inaugural CUDC, organized by the University of Waterloo, brought together 61 teams from 16 universities across 7 provinces, exceeding pre-pandemic participation levels.

== Organization ==
CUSID is subdivided into three regional bodies, representing each region of Canada:

- CUSID Central, for Ontario and Quebec, which sponsors the Central Canadian Debating Championship (Léger Cup)
- CUSID East, for the Atlantic Provinces, which sponsors the Atlantic Canadian Debating Championship
- CUSID West, for the Western Provinces and Territories, which sponsors the Western Canadian Debating Championship (McGoun Cup)

CUSID nationally and internationally sanctions several official championship tournaments, including:

- Canadian Parliamentary National Debating Championship
- Canadian Universities Debating Championship
- Central Canadian Debating Championship (the Léger Cup)
- Western Canadian Debating Championship (the McGoun Cup)
- Atlantic Canadian Debating Championship
- North American Debating Championship (with the American Parliamentary Debate Association)
- North American University Debating Championship
- World Universities Debating Championship (with other national debate organizations)

The president of CUSID is the head of the organization and leads an elected executive team of six national and regional officers. They also represents CUSID and Canadian debating interests inside and outside of Canada, and is the Canadian representative on the World Universities Debating Council. They are elected annually by the member institutions at the National Championships.

There have been seven CUSID Presidents who have won either of the National Championships during their term as President: Jason Brent (1992), Gerald Butts (1993), Robert Silver (2000), Vinay Mysore (2010), Louis Tsilivis (2013), Harar Hall (2019), and Daniel Svirsky (2023, 2024).

=== Notable Presidents of CUSID ===
- Matthew Mendelsohn (1986–1988)
- Todd Swift (1988–1989)
- Gerald Butts (1992–1993)
- Shuman Ghosemajumder (1994–1995)

== Formats ==
=== Canadian Parliamentary ===
Many CUSID tournaments are held in the Canadian Parliamentary Style of debate. This style emphasizes argumentation and rhetoric, rather than research and detailed factual knowledge. Each round consists of two teams – the government team and the opposition team – each of which consists of two debaters. Teams alternate between government and opposition at tournaments. The speaking times in CUSID Central and East are:

- Prime Minister Constructive (PMC): 7 minutes
- Member of Opposition (MO): 7 minutes
- Minister of the Crown (MC): 7 minutes
- Leader of Opposition (LO): 10 minutes
- Prime Minister Rebuttal (PMR): 3 minutes

There are also alternative timings that may be used in other competitions. For example, the Canadian Student Debating Federation's (CSDF) 2011 Rules for Debate outlined 8 minutes each for the MO, MC and LO, as well as 5 minutes for PMC and 3 minutes for PMR. Additionally, a new modification to the prior CUSID Central and East times was introduced at the 2003 McGill University Winter Carnival Invitational called the Prime Minister's Rebuttal Extension (PMRE). The PMRE allows the government team the option to take a 6-minute PMC and 4-minute PMR and was designed to help compensate for the alleged inherent advantage to the opposition side. In most rounds, the resolution is "squirrelable", meaning that the government team can propose any topic it wants for debate. The PMC lays out the topic for debate and presents arguments in favor of its position. The opposition team must then immediately present opposing arguments. New arguments can be presented in the first four speeches; they are prohibited in the rebuttal speeches. In the early 2010s the "opposition choice" option was introduced. Rather than presenting the motion as it stands, the Prime Minister lays out the topic and the opposite bench has the option of choosing which side of the motion they would prefer.

"Points of information" are generally permitted and expected in the standard Canadian Parliamentary style. With POIs, debaters may rise and attempt to ask a question of an opposing debater, who can choose whether to accept or refuse the question. It is generally considered good form to accept at least a few questions during a speech.

=== British Parliamentary ===
Tournaments are otherwise held in British Parliamentary, sometimes known as WUDC style. Presently, all tournaments for the first semester of the academic year, September–December, use British Parliamentary as the format. This is for teams to prepare for the World University Debating Championship which occurs over New Year's each year. Since its introduction, British Parliamentary has become the more competitive of the two formats, largely because it is the format used for international competition.

== Canadian Parliamentary National Championships ==
Year	Host	Winner	Team	Top Debater	Team	Public Speaking Champion	Team
2026	Calgary	Jaleelah Ammar & Daniel Svirsky	Hybrid Ottawa/Western	Daniel Svirsky	Western	Uncontested	N/A
2025	Ottawa	Jacob Silcoff & Patrick Cowley	Hybrid McGill/Toronto	Patrick Cowley	Toronto	Uncontested	N/A
2024	Toronto	Daniel Svirsky & Diggory Waddle	Hybrid Western/Independent	Jacob Silcoff	McGill	Rhys Nickerson	McGill
2023	SMU	Diggory Waddle & Nicholas Abernethy	Queen's	Nicholas Abernethy	Queen's	Alison Uppal	Dalhousie
2022	Queen's	Jun Kim & Ethan Curry	Western	Abigail Conrad	UBC	Abigail Conrad	UBC
2021	Ottawa	Navin Kariyawasam & Eric Zhao	Toronto	Sarah Zamponi	UBC	Emily Xie	Western
2020	Calgary	Deborah Wong & Dhananjay Ashok	Toronto	Jacob Silcoff	McGill	Emily Xie	Western
2019	Western	Harar Hall & Isaac Botham	Carleton	Harar Hall	Carleton	Uman Tamann	McGill
2018	Queen's	William Onyeaju & Cole Bricker	Osgoode	Kiana Saint-Macary	McGill	Jacob Silcoff	McGill
2017	McGill	Betsy Studholme & Ksenia Podvoiskaia	Queen's	Ryan Howson	Western	Cassandra Cervi	Western
2016	Alberta	Mitchell Dorbyk & Tavish Logan	Queen's	Mitchell Dorbyk	Queen's	Janel Comeau	Alberta
2015	McGill	Sam Greene & Joe McGrade	Toronto	Julia Kirby	Queen's	Carmen Reilly	Toronto
2014	Dalhousie	Julia Kirby & Michelle Polster	Queen's	Veenu Goswami	Toronto	Daniel Milton	McGill
2013	UBC	Veenu Goswami & Louis Tsilivis	Toronto	Veenu Goswami	Toronto	Travis Gritter	UBC
2012	Osgoode	Anisah Hassan & Joshua Stark	Toronto	Deirdre Casey	Toronto	Alex Amar	McGill
2011	Western	Steven Penner & George Trotter	Toronto	George Trotter	Toronto	Husein Panju	Queen's
2010	Alberta	Sophie McIntyre & Vinay Mysore	McGill	Sean Stefanik	McGill	Christopher McMillan	Calgary
2009	USask	Richard Lizius & Paul-Erik Veel	Toronto	Richard Lizius	Toronto	Dan Powell	RMC
2008	Dalhousie	Monica Ferris & Jon Laxer	Toronto	Richard Lizius	Toronto	Vinay Mysore	McGill
2007	Queen's	Adrienne Lipsey & Richard Lizius	Toronto	Mike Jancik & Jason Rogers	McGill	Leon Grek	McGill
2006	Carleton	Ian Freeman & Gaurav Toshniwal	Toronto	Laura Kusisto	Queen's	Jason Rogers	McGill
2005	Alberta	Rahool Agarwal & Michael Kotrly	Toronto	James Renihan	Toronto	Ian Freeman	Toronto
2004	McGill	Emily Cohen & Omar Fairclough	York	Kevin Massie	Queen's	Marc Laferriere	Ottawa
2003	Dalhousie	Greg Allen & Rahim Moloo	UBC	Kevin Massie	UBC	Emma Lowman	McMaster
2002	UBC	Rory McKeown & Aaron Rousseau	Toronto	Nicola Matthews	Queen's	Michael Meeuwis	Toronto
2001	York	Nicola Matthews & Mike Podgorski	Queen's	Michael Meeuwis	Toronto	John Whelan	Memorial University
2000	Memorial	Ranjan Agarwal & Robert Silver	Ottawa	Robert Silver	Ottawa	Andrew Zadel	McGill
1999	Western	Sacha Bhatia & Dena Varah	McGill	Nathan MacDonald	Guelph	Duncan Retson	Acadia
1998	Alberta	Jacob Glick & Grant Yiu	Toronto	Mike Shore	Toronto	Melanie Marshall	Ryerson
1997	Dalhousie	Brent Patterson & Robert Silver	Western	Casey Halladay	Western	Marc Field	Memorial
1996	Ottawa	Allen Middlebro & Jordan Tan	Carleton	Ron Guirguis	Guelph	James Clitheroe	Carleton
1995	Bishop's	Randy Cass & Frank Cesario	Toronto	Randy Cass	Toronto	John Bielby	Concordia
1994	York	Peter Balasubramanian & Gerald Butts	McGill	David Orr	Western	Awi Sinha	Ottawa
1993	Guelph	Peter Balasubramanian & Gerald Butts	McGill	John Haffner	Dalhousie	Marc Weber	Waterloo
1992	Western	Jason Brent & Tom Meehan	Toronto	Marc Givens	Queen's	Marc Weber	Waterloo
1991	Coast Guard	Jason Brent & Tom Meehan	Toronto	Kevin Whitehouse	Ottawa	James Rocchi	Western
1990	RMC	Tim Daley & Laura Stewart	Dalhousie	Chris Wayland	McGill	Steven Johnson	McGill
1989	Queen's	Judy Hearn & Stephen Pitel	Carleton	Justin MacGregor	Toronto	Justin MacGregor	Toronto
1988	Waterloo	Diane Brady & Paul Paton	Toronto	Mark McKeegan	Carleton	Chris Chandler	McGill
1987	Memorial	Matt Colledge & Neil Steinman	Queen's	Matthew Mendelsohn	McGill	Mark McKeegan	Carleton
1986	UBC	Ian Hanomansing & Cyril Johnston	Dalhousie	Ian Hanomansing	Dalhousie	Ian Hanomansing	Dalhousie
1985	Concordia	Doug Cooper & Paul Cooper	Toronto	Ian Hanomansing	Dalhousie	Ian Hanomansing	Dalhousie
1984	Dalhousie	John Duffy & Jeff Nankivell	Toronto	Keith Martin	McGill	?	?
1983	Victoria	Gary Boyd & Michael McCulloch	Ottawa	Ian Hanomansing	Mount Allison	?	?
1982	RMC	Dale Darling & Gwynneth Jones	Queen's	Tom Gough	Toronto	Sean May	Ottawa
1981	Dalhousie	Charlie Lavergne & Joe Pollender	McGill	Joe Pollender	McGill	?	?
1980	Alberta	Gary Boyd & Michael McCulloch	Ottawa	?	?	?	?
1979	Queen's	Thomas Gough & Michael McCulloch	Toronto	?	?	?	?
1978	Ottawa	Fred McMahon & Oscar Mullerbeck	McGill	?	?	?	?

Canadian Parliamentary National Debating Championship By Institution

Institution	Championship Wins	Top Speakers	Public Speaking Wins	Years Hosted	Last Championship Win
Toronto	21	13	4	0	2025
Queen's	7	7	1	5	2023
McGill	7	7	10	3	2025
Carleton	3	2	2	1	2019
Ottawa	3	2	3	3	2008
Dalhousie	2	3	3	6	1990
Western	2	3	4	4	2022
Osgoode	1	0	0	1	2018
UBC	1	3	2	3	2003
York	1	0	0	2	2004
Acadia	0	0	1	0	-
Alberta	0	0	1	5	-
Bishop's	0	0	0	1	-
Calgary	0	0	1	2	-
Coast Guard	0	0	0	1	-
Concordia	0	0	1	1	-
Guelph	0	2	0	1	-
McMaster	0	0	1	0	-
Memorial	0	0	2	2	-
Mount Allison	0	1	0	0	-
RMC	0	0	1	2	-
TMU	0	0	1	0	-
SMU	0	0	0	1	-
USask	0	0	0	1	-
Victoria	0	0	0	1	-
Waterloo	0	0	2	1	-

== Canadian Universities Debating Championships (formerly British Parliamentary National Championships) ==
Year	Host	Winner	Team	Top Speaker	Team	Top Novice Speaker	Team
2025	Dalhousie University	Jaleelah Ammar & Anders Cairns Woodruff	Independent	Anders Cairns Woodruff	Independent	Liam Evans	Toronto
2024	Waterloo	Rhys Nickerson & Reana Yan	Independent	Reana Yan	Independent	Edward Wang	Western
2023	Calgary	Daniel Svirsky & Nicholas Abernethy	Hybrid Western-Queens	Nicholas Abernethy	Queens	Hao Ni	Western
2022	Carleton	Micaela Lewis & Jacob Silcoff	McGill	Rhys Nickerson	McGill	Alex Logan	Western
2021	Alberta	Daniel Svirsky & Kate Xinyi He	Hybrid Western-Dalhousie	Diggory Waddle	Queens	Eamon Roach	Toronto
2020	Carleton	Matthew Farrell & Max Rosen	McGill	Ruth Silcoff	McGill	Gabrielle Wong	SFU
2019	McGill	Ethan Curry & Addy Rawat	Hybrid Western-Queens	Navin Kariyawasam	Toronto	Joshua Cohen	Dawson
2018	Carleton	Kiana Saint-Macary & Ahmad Nehme	Hybrid McGill-Montreal	Kiana Saint-Macary	McGill	Dhananjay Ashok	Toronto
2017	McGill	Connor Ahluwalia & Matthew Gallagher	Carleton	Sarah Millman	Toronto	Armin Safavi	Toronto
2016	UBC	Kiana Saint-Macary & Alexander Beaumont	McGill	Jason Xiao	Independent	Jayun Bae	Toronto
2015	York	Julia Kirby & Julia Milden	Queens	Aislin Flynn	Toronto	Jason Xiao	UBC
2014	Western	Aislin Flynn & Sean Husband	Toronto	Daniel Milton	McGill	Julia Milden	Queens
2013	McMaster	Sarah Balakrishnan & Cole Bricker	McGill	Brent Schmidt	Western	Brittany Haughey	Carleton
2012	Victoria	Bhuvana Sankar & Pardeep Dhaliwal	Hybrid Toronto-Calgary	Robert Lees-Miller	Alberta	Chardaye Bueckert	SFU
2011	Laurier	Josh Stark & Veenu Goswami	Toronto	Steven Penner & Veenu Goswami (Tie)	Toronto	Lyle Dobbin	McGill
2010	Dalhousie	Sam Greene & Steven Penner	Toronto	Brent Kettles	Toronto	Ted Mateoc	McGill
2009	UBC	Richard Lizius & Ian Freeman	Toronto	Michael Imeson	Alaska		
2008	Queen's	Richard Lizius & Ian Freeman	Toronto	Richard Lizius	Toronto	Sean Husband	McGill
2007	Alberta	Adam Coombs & Garnett Genuis	Carleton	Ian Freeman	Toronto	George Trotter	Toronto
2006	Toronto	Derek Lande & David Denton	Hybrid University College Cork-Yale	Ben Eidelson	Yale	Sophie MacIntyre	McGill
2005	UBC	Rory McKeown & Gaurav Toshniwal	Toronto	James Renihan	Toronto		
2004	Toronto	Gordon Shotwell & Jess Prince	McGill	Rory Gillis	Yale	Luke Champlin	Colgate

== Related ==
- (United Kingdom) : Cambridge Union Society
- (United Kingdom) : Oxford Union Society
- (United Kingdom) : The Durham Union Society
- (United Kingdom) : London School of Economics, Grimshaw International Relations Club
- (United States) : Yale Debate Association
- (United States) : Berkeley Forum
- (Germany) : Studentenforum im Tönissteiner Kreis
- : Olivaint Conference of Belgium
- (Quebec) : Ligue de débat universitaire et collégiale
- (Canada) : University of Western Ontario Debate Society
