= Rutgers University Debate Union =

General Information
- Established: 2001
- Website: rutgersdebate.wixsite.com/rudu

The Rutgers University Debate Union (RUDU) is Rutgers University's intercollegiate debate team. Re-founded in 2001, the Union's roots extend back to the 18th century literary societies that existed at Rutgers (then Queen's College). There have also been the tradition of King's-Queen's Debates with Columbia University (then King's College) when Rutgers was known under its founding name of Queen's College.

RUDU currently competes on the American Parliamentary Debate Association (APDA) circuit, in which it has placed in the top ten for the majority of the past decade. Among other accomplishments, RUDU members have been APDA National Championship finalists and APDA Team of the Year (TOTY) winners.

== History ==
While RUDU was re-founded in 2001 after a period of dormancy, there is a strong history of debate at Rutgers. The team not only debated Columbia in the King's/Queen's debates of the 18th century, they also purportedly took part in the first intercollegiate debate of the modern era, held against New York University in 1881. Paul Robeson was a member of Rutgers' debate team during his time there in the 1910s. Rutgers debaters were often quite successful, notching a long winning streak in the early 20th century and defeating Harvard University in 1947.

Rutgers debaters made the elimination rounds at the first-ever National Debate Tournament in 1947 and went on to compete in debate events nationally until about 1997. The team also competed in speech events for much of the 1970s and 1980s, reaching a national ranking of 17th at the National Forensics League championship in 1980. Among the notable members of this period were J.G. Harrington, who later became the first Rutgers alumni inducted into the National Forensics Hall of Fame, Paul Mansfield, a national quarter-finalist in Impromptu Speaking in 1980, and David Fischler, a national quarter-finalist in Rhetorical Criticism in 1980 who led the team from 1977 to 1980. The Debate Union appears to have disappeared completely from the campus from 1997 to 2001 before its modern rebirth.

== Structure ==
RUDU is run by an elected executive board. The E-Board makes nearly all decisions pertaining to management of the team. Currently, the E-Board consists of five members: a President, Vice President, Treasurer, Public Relations Chair, and Novice Mentor. It also appoints a tournament director.

In addition to the E-Board, RUDU has in the past been run by a full-time Coach, who is an employee of the university. In its modern incarnation, Rutgers went without a Coach from 2001 to 2009, and has not had a coach since 2018.

RUDU Coaches
Coach Name	Tenure
Storey Clayton	2009-2014
Chris Baia (assistant)	2012-2014
Matthew Maddex	2014-2018

== National Competition ==
RUDU competes in the American Parliamentary style of debate as a member of the American Parliamentary Debate Association (APDA), which is an intercollegiate debate association with over fifty member universities across the United States. RUDU attends tournaments across the country each week during the APDA season, from September through April.

The team also hosts an annual tournament in the spring, the Rutgers Invitational, traditionally in February. This event attracts many APDA institutions from around the country, and is among the largest competitions held each year.

The team hosted the APDA National Championships in 2017 and the North American Championships in 2018.

== Related ==
- (United Kingdom) : Cambridge Union Society
- (United Kingdom) : Oxford Union Society
- (United Kingdom) : The Durham Union Society
- (United Kingdom) : London School of Economics, Grimshaw International Relations Club
- (United States) :Yale Debate Association
- (United States) :Berkeley Forum
- (France) :Olivaint Conférence
- (Germany) :Studentenforum im Tönissteiner Kreis
- :Olivaint Conference of Belgium
