= Brown Debating Union =

Debating society at Brown University, Rhode Island, US

General information
- Established: 1824
- Website: www.browndebate.org

The Brown Debating Union (BDU) is a student-run debating organization at Brown University in Providence, Rhode Island, United States. The team competes in American Parliamentary Debate and British Parliamentary Debate. Currently the team is ranked 2nd in North America.

== History ==
The Brown Debating Union has existed since 1824. It began to organize formal debate tournaments with peer institutions, as well as on-campus debates for student groups, during the early twentieth century. By the 1950s, the debate program had become part of the Brown University English Department. Competing on the National Debate Tournament circuit, the debate team was fairly successful.

However, in the 1980s the English department stopped funding the team, and the BDU became an autonomous student organization funded by the Undergraduate Finance Board. Without the funds to participate in costly policy debate, they participated in parliamentary debate. The Union currently competes in debate tournaments held by the American Parliamentary Debate Association. Their annual debate tournament is typically held during the last weekend of October every year.

Since 1882, the BDU has held the Radcliffe Hicks Debate, an annual contest for sophomores and juniors. First and second-place winners receive monetary prizes from the Hicks endowment.

== Structure ==
The Brown Debating Union is run by a board of students elected every winter. The board is responsible for organizational decisions including handling finances, running tournaments and training students. The board consists of eight members: the president, vp of operations, vp of finance, vp of administration, vp of recruitment, logistics chair, social chair and communications chair.

== National competition ==
The Brown Debating Union competes mostly in the American Parliamentary style of debate as a member of the American Parliamentary Debate Association, an intercollegiate debate association with over fifty member universities across the United States. The BDU competes at tournaments across the country that take place on Fridays and Saturdays each week. It also hosts its own parliamentary debate tournament twice a year, and has been involved in APDA governance, with BDU members serving on APDA's executive board.

Brown debaters have won several national awards from APDA, including twice speaker of the year:

- 2004, Brookes Brown
- 2020, Sandy Greenberg

== International competition ==
The Brown Debating Union also competes internationally, notably at the North American Debating Championship, the World Universities Debating Championship, as well as Inter-Varsity tournaments at Oxford, Cambridge, and Hart House. BDU debaters won the inaugural North American Women's Debating Championship in 2015 and were semifinalists at the 2014 North American Universities Debating Championship.

== Notable members ==
- Ted Turner was Vice President of the BDU
