= Dahlia Lithwick =

Canadian-American lawyer, writer and journalist

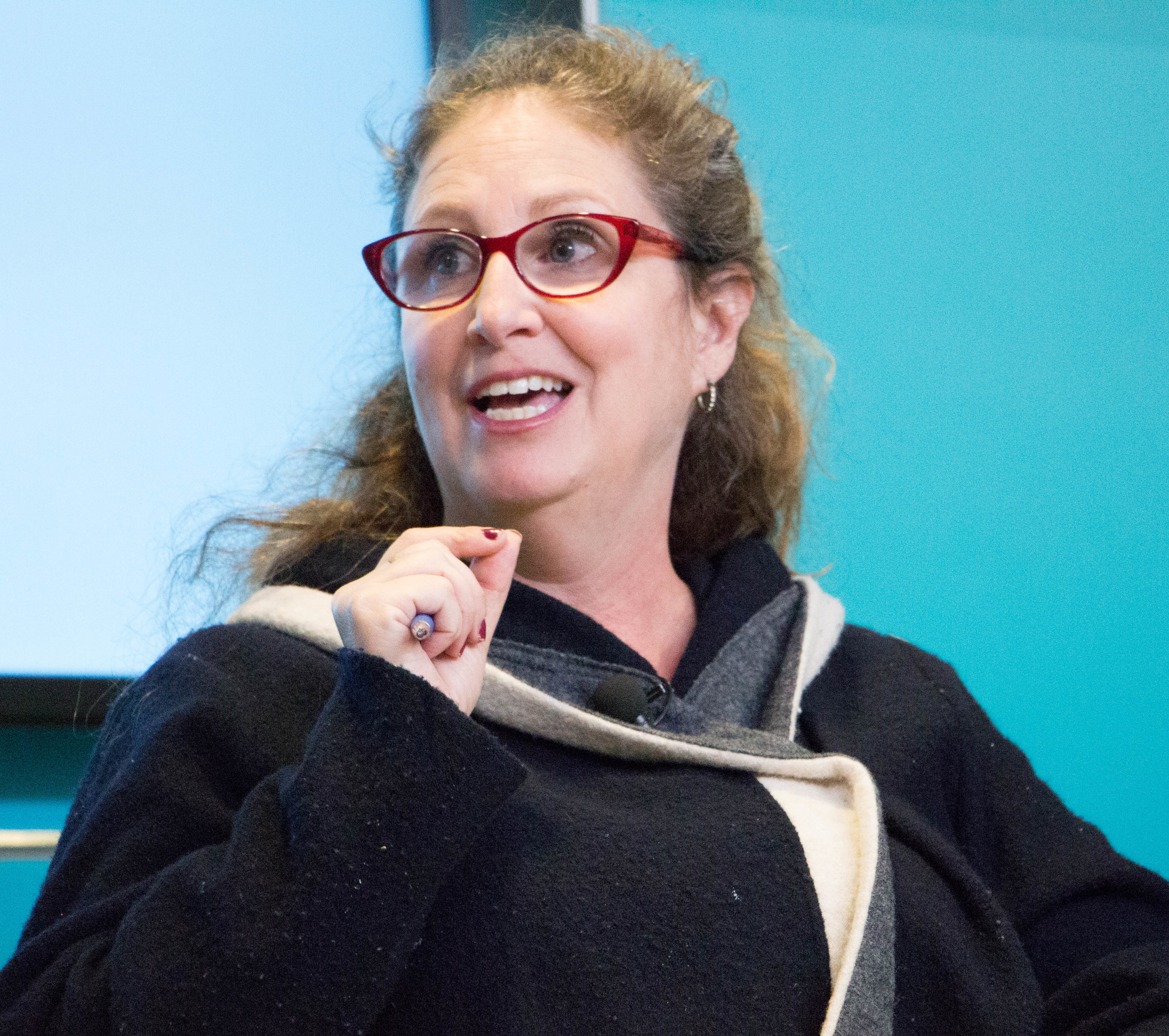
- Born: 1967 or 1968 (age 58–59); Ottawa, Ontario, Canada
- Education: Yale University (BA); Stanford University (JD)
- Occupations: Attorney; editor; commentator

Dahlia Lithwick is a Canadian-American lawyer, writer, and journalist. Lithwick is a contributing editor at Newsweek and senior editor at Slate. She primarily writes about law and politics in the United States. She writes "Supreme Court Dispatches" and "Jurisprudence" and has covered the Microsoft trial and other legal issues for Slate. In 2018, the Sidney Hillman Foundation awarded Lithwick with the Hillman Prize for Opinion & Analysis Journalism, saying she "has been the nation's best legal commentator for two decades".

Before joining Slate as a freelancer in 1999, Lithwick worked for a family law firm in Reno, Nevada. Her published work has appeared in The New Republic, The American Prospect, Elle, The Ottawa Citizen, and The Washington Post.

== Early life and education ==
Lithwick was born to a Jewish family, in Ottawa, Ontario, Canada and is a Canadian citizen. She moved to the U.S. to study at Yale University, where she received a B.A. degree in English in 1990. As a student at Yale, she debated on the American Parliamentary Debate Association circuit as a member of the Yale Debate Association. In 1990, she and her debate partner at the time, Austan Goolsbee, were runners up for the national Team of the Year.

She went on to study law at Stanford Law School, where she received her J.D. degree in 1996. She then clerked for Judge Procter Ralph Hug Jr. of the United States Court of Appeals for the Ninth Circuit. She is Jewish and keeps a kosher home.

== Career ==
She was a regular guest on The Al Franken Show and has been a guest columnist for The New York Times Op-Ed page. Lithwick is Slate's legal correspondent, providing summaries and commentary on current United States Supreme Court cases. Lithwick also hosts the podcast Amicus. She received the Online News Association's award for online commentary in 2001. In a 2012 Slate article, she coined the concept of "Muppet Theory", which makes analogies of social organization to characters from the American puppet media franchise The Muppets.

== Bibliography ==
=== Books ===
- Dahlia Lithwick. Lady Justice: Women, the Law, and the Battle to Save America, 2022. ISBN 0-5255-6138-2.
- Dahlia Lithwick, Brandt Goldstein. Me v. Everybody: Absurd Contracts for an Absurd World, 2003. ISBN 0-7611-2389-X.
- Paula Franklin, Carol Regan, Dahlia Lithwick. Building a national immunization system: A guide to immunization services and resources, 1994. ISBN 1-881985-06-7.
- Larry Berger, Dahlia Lithwick. I Will Sing Life: Voices from the Hole in the Wall Gang Camp, 1992. ISBN 0-316-09273-8.

=== Articles ===
- Dahlia Lithwick. "The Legal Memos: How the rules were rewritten". Slate. Archived from the original on 27 December 2009.
- Dahlia Lithwick (28 May 2008). "Legal corner-cutting derails FLDS justice". The Dallas Morning News. Archived from the original on 14 October 2008.
- Dahlia Lithwick (13 November 2009). "Supreme Court Dispatch, Eh: How the United States' never-ending legal mess at Gitmo is spilling over into Canada". Slate magazine. Archived from the original on 17 February 2011.
- Dahlia Lithwick (10 February 2010). "Watering Torture Down: Why are the media so happy to use the T word in a child-abuse case?". Slate magazine. Archived from the original on 13 February 2010.
- Lithwick, Dahlia (12 March 2012). "Extreme Makeover: The Story Behind the Story of Lawrence v Texas". The New Yorker.
- Lithwick, Dahlia (8 June 2012). "Chaos Theory: A Unified Theory of Muppet Types". Slate.com.
