= Randall Hansen =

Political scientist and historian

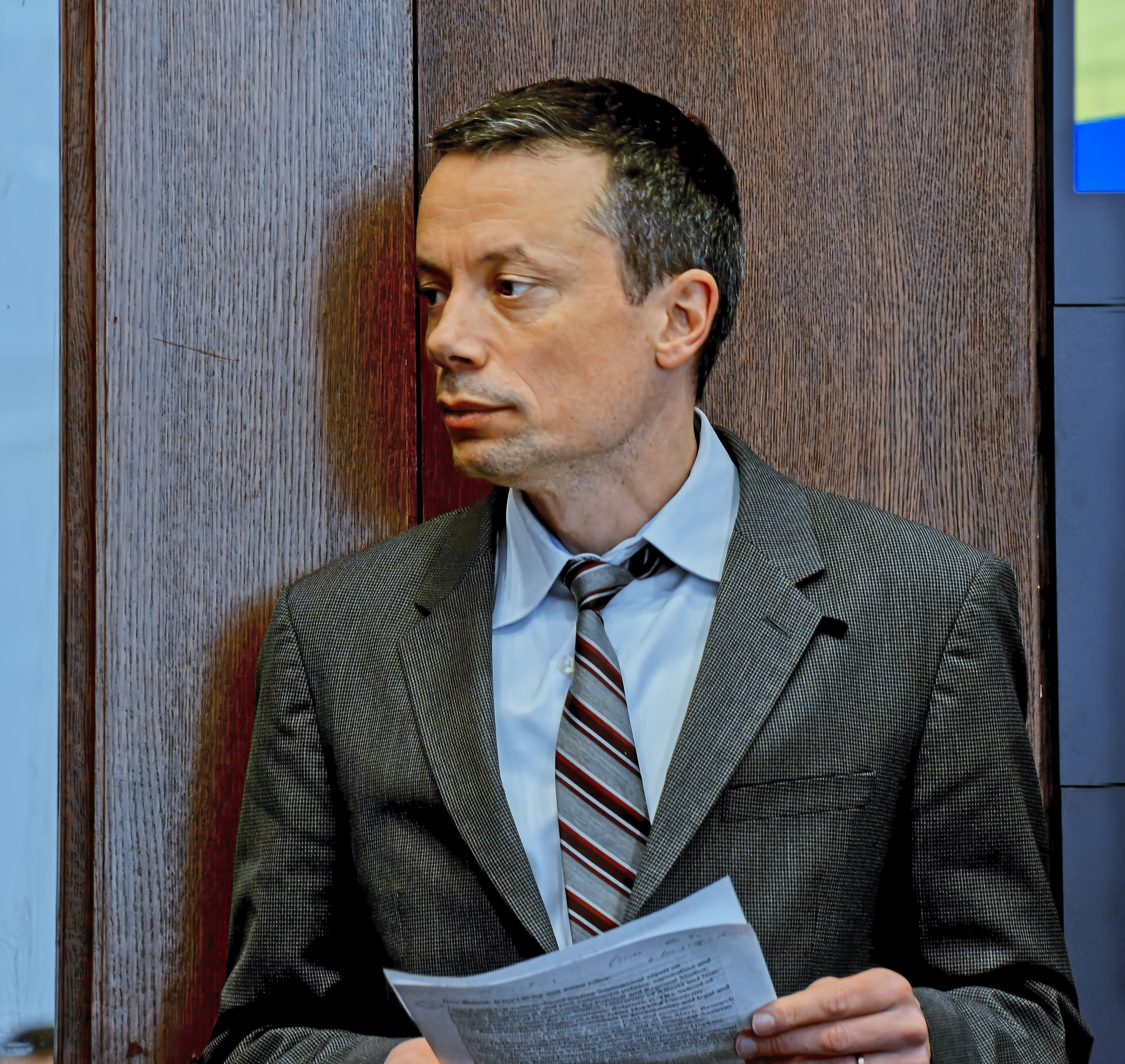

Academic background
- Education: University of British Columbia (BA); St. John's College, Oxford (MPhil); Nuffield College, Oxford (DPhil)

Academic work
- Institutions: University of Toronto
- Main interests: Migration, eugenics, war and civilian populations
- Notable works: Fire and Fury, Disobeying Hitler

Randall Hansen is a Canadian political scientist and historian at the University of Toronto, where he holds a Canada Research Chair in Global Migration in the Department of Political Science. He is also Director of the Global Migration Lab at the Munk School of Global Affairs and Public Policy. Hansen taught at the Queen Mary University of London and the University of Oxford (where he was a tutorial fellow at Merton College) before taking up his current position.

His fields of research are migration and citizenship, eugenics and population policy, and the effect of war on civilian populations. He has authored four books, Citizenship and Immigration in Postwar Britain, Fire and Fury: the Allied Bombing of Germany 1942-1945, Disobeying Hitler: German Resistance after Valkyrie., and War, Work and Want: How the OPEC Oil Crisis Caused Mass Migration and Revolution.

Hansen was co-editor (with Matthew J. Gibney) of Immigration and Asylum: From 1900 to the Present. He is co-author (with Desmond King) of Sterilized by the State: Eugenics, Race and the Population Scare in 20th Century North America.

Fire and Fury was a Canadian bestseller, described by Vice as "well-received," and was nominated for a Governor's General award, specifically the Governor General's Literary Award for Non-Fiction in 2009. Additionally, he has contributed numerous articles to academic journals.

In 2018, sales of Fire and Fury surged upon the publication of Michael Wolff's best-selling book of the same title about the Presidency of Donald Trump. Some people bought Hansen's book by mistake, while others became aware of it because of the publicity over the Wolff book.

Hansen was the Interim Director of the Munk School of Global Affairs for the period 1 June 2017 to 31 January 2020, succeeding Stephen Toope, and Director of the Centre for European, Russian and Eurasian Studies at the Munk School from 2011 to 2022.
