= The "No-Problem" Problem =

Problem of bias in reference to the gender gap

The "No-Problem" Problem refers to an often spoken facet of systemic bias, whereby exclusion of minorities or marginalized people and knowledge occurs because the issue is perceived as either not a problem, or not the speaker's problem. The term was defined in 1990 by Deborah Rhode who published a paper by this title in the 1991 Yale Law Journal.

The term, inspired by difficulties of people grappling with class and racial issues, was applied by Rhode specifically to the women's movement as being a problem of perception, since "the most traditional approach has been to acknowledge gender disparities, but to deny their injustice". Twenty years later, the problem was revisited by Brenda Frink of the Clayman Institute for Gender Research with her article The persistence of the no-problem problem. She quoted Rhode's 2010 book on the subject of women's physical appearance, The Beauty Bias: The Injustice of Appearance in Life and Law. The idea of perception in the problem had been taken a step further and been distilled into an issue of physical appearance, since "women who fall short of cultural beauty ideals are disadvantaged in jobs, salaries, and promotions even where looks bear no obvious relationship to performance". In 2014 Ilene Fischer wrote a blog in the Huffington Post titled The No-Problem Problem applying the term to the gender pay gap at Microsoft.
