= Boston University Debate Society =

- Formation: 1999
- Type: Student debating union
- Headquarters: Boston
- President: Josh Lyons

The Boston University Debate Society is a member of the American Parliamentary Debate Association (also known as APDA). The current incarnation of the Boston University Debate Society was formed in 1999, and competes in parliamentary debate. Previously, Boston University teams competed in other varieties of collegiate debate. For instance, in 1975 a team from Boston University came in third at the National Debate Tournament, a policy debate competition..

The current incarnation of the Debate Society is most notable for two of its former members, Greg Meyer and Alex Taubes, winning the American Parliamentary Debate Association's National Championship, and their Team of the Year award in 2011. Taubes also won the Speaker of the Year award in that same year, cementing Taubes as one of the greatest debaters in the history of the league, Meyer and Taubes as one of the greatest duos in the history of the league, and Boston University as one of the foremost debating institutions in the nation. It also brought great fame to Boston University, as it was the first competitive academic national championship that the school had ever been honored with.
