= Ralph Cavanagh =

American lawyer

Ralph Cavanagh was a senior attorney and co-director of Natural Resources Defense Council's energy program. Cavanagh was with the NRDC from 1979 to 2023 and was on the Secretary of Energy Advisory board from 1993 to 2003. Cavanagh has served as visiting professor at both Stanford University and UC Berkeley.

Cavanagh has won multiple awards, including the 3rd Annual Heinz Award for Public Policy in 1997, the National Association of Regulatory Utility Commissioners’ Mary Kilmarx Award, the Yale Law School's Preiskel-Silverman Fellowship, the NW Energy Coalition's Headwaters Award, and the Bonneville Power Administration's Award for Exceptional Public Service.

Cavanagh graduated from Yale College, where he was a member of the Yale debate team, and the Yale Law School. He was married to Deborah Rhode (1952–2021), MacFarland Professor of Law at Stanford Law School.

In 2021, Cavanagh took a leave from NRDC and joined the Bipartisan Policy Center, and relocated to the Washington DC area.

Cavanagh has been anti-nuclear energy and was a key architect of the 2016 deal to shut down Diablo Canyon.

== See also ==
- Renewable energy
- Energy conservation in the United States
