= Deborah Rhode =

American jurist, writer, feminist, and professor (1952–2021)

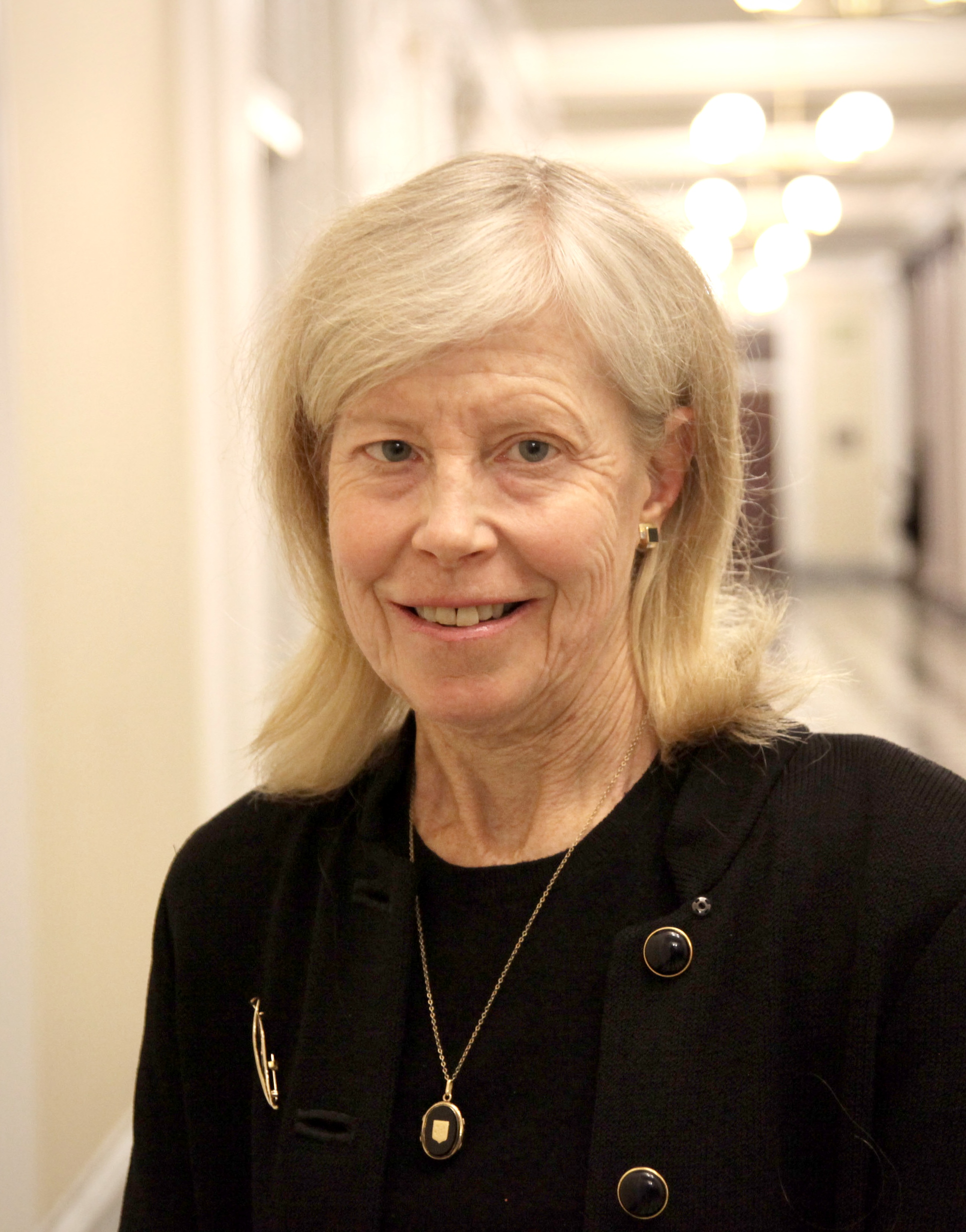
- Rhode in 2011
- Born: January 29, 1952; Evanston, Illinois, U.S.
- Died: January 8, 2021 (aged 68)

Academic background
- Education: Yale Law School

Academic work
- Institutions: Stanford Law School
- Main interests: Legal ethics, gender and the law, leadership and lawyering
- Notable works: Access to Justice; In the Interests of Justice; Justice and Gender; Speaking of Sex; Pro Bono in Principle and in Practice; The Beauty Bias; The Difference "Difference" Makes
- Notable ideas: "The 'No-Problem' Problem"
- Website: https://law.stanford.edu/directory/deborah-l-rhode/

Deborah Lynn Rhode (January 29, 1952 – January 8, 2021) was an American jurist. She was the Ernest W. McFarland Professor of Law at Stanford Law School and the nation's most frequently cited scholar in legal ethics. From her early days at Yale Law School, her work revolved around questions of injustice in the practice of law and the challenges of identifying and redressing it. Rhode founded and led several research centers at Stanford devoted to these issues, including its Center on the Legal Profession, Center on Ethics and Program in Law and Social Entrepreneurship; she also led the Michelle R. Clayman Institute for Gender Research at Stanford. She coined the term "The 'No-Problem' Problem".

A prolific writer, she authored 30 books on subjects including legal ethics, gender and the law, and law and leadership; her major works include In the Interest of Justice, Justice and Gender, Speaking of Sex, Women and Leadership, Lawyers as Leaders, and The Beauty Bias. She was elected to the American Academy of Arts and Sciences and was honored repeatedly by the American Bar Association as well as by the White House as a "Champion of Change".

== Education and early career ==
Deborah Lynn Rhode was born on January 29, 1952, in Evanston, Illinois, and grew up in Wilmette and Kenilworth. At New Trier High School during the late 1960s, she was a nationally ranked debater, competing against eventual Supreme Court nominee Merrick Garland. She enrolled in Yale University in 1970 in the second class to admit women. Originally she wanted to work on poverty and had no interest in feminism, but an advisor gave her reading by Simone de Beauvoir that transformed Rhode's perception of the world. The status of women as "unwanted minority" made an impression, for instance in university administrators who could not see any problem with describing the new student body as "a thousand male leaders and 250 women". Rhode became a member of Phi Beta Kappa and the Yale debate team, becoming its first female president (a role previously held by William F. Buckley Jr. and John Kerry). She received her B.A., summa cum laude, in political science in 1974.

She then enrolled at Yale Law School and worked in the law school's legal clinic which she said left her "angry all the time" at the injustice she witnessed. She and others in the clinic wrote a manual for low-income clients who could not afford attorney's fees for uncontested divorces—drawing the ire of the local bar association—but she also decided the practice of law was not sustainable for her and found her calling instead in legal academia. Her first academic work was a study of this issue; she published a paper in the Yale Law Journal, co-authored with Ralph Cavanagh (later her husband), finding that clients in uncontested divorces did equally well with advice from law students as from attorneys. Rhode became editor of the Journal and director of the moot court board. She received her J.D. from Yale Law School in 1977.

After law school, Rhode clerked for Judge Murray Gurfein of the U.S. Court of Appeals for the Second Circuit in 1977–78 and for U.S. Supreme Court Justice Thurgood Marshall in the 1978–79 term. She became friends with Merrick Garland, who clerked for William J. Brennan Jr. in the same year.

== Academic career ==
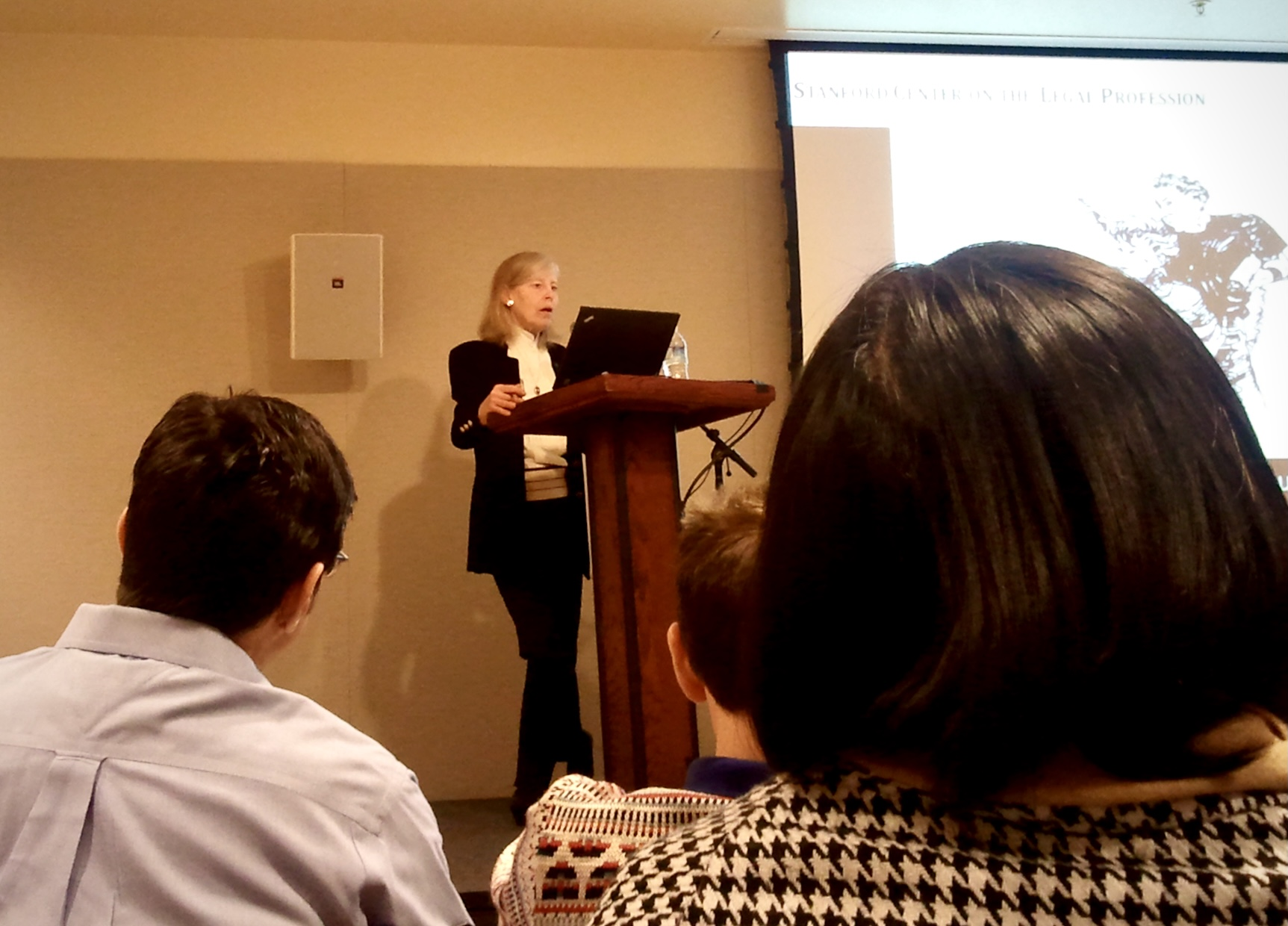
Rhode giving a presentation in 2011

Following her Supreme Court clerkship, in 1979 Rhode joined the faculty of Stanford Law School as an associate professor, becoming the third woman on the faculty, after Barbara Babcock and assistant professor Carol Rose (Rose left at the end of Rhode's first year). She remained an associate professor through 1984, then became the second woman to gain tenure at Stanford Law School, after Babcock. At Stanford, the overwhelmingly male environment spurred Rhode to teach the law school's first class on gender and the law; it came in response to episodes such as a retirement party of the law school's dean that she attended in 1981, at which a stripper had been hired. She was also the first to teach a course on leadership for lawyers, lamenting that so many attorneys ended up in political positions of power without having any preparation for it as part of their legal education.

Rhode served as a member of the Yale Corporation, the governing body of Yale University from 1983 to 1989, where she found that the gender issues she dealt with in the previous decade persisted. She tried to nominate Simone de Beauvoir, who had been so pivotal for Rhode, for an honorary degree from Yale, but the majority-male group resisted, questioning whether de Beauvoir had written her own work, saying it could have been written by "her husband".

Rhode was a president of the Association of American Law Schools, the founding president of the International Association of Legal Ethics, and the chair of the American Bar Association's Commission on Women in the Profession. She founded and led a number of research centers at Stanford, including the Center on Ethics where she was director from 2003 to 2007; Center on the Legal Profession (later renamed the Deborah L. Rhode Center on the Legal Profession in her honor upon passing); and Center on Ethics and Program in Law and Social Entrepreneurship. She was also the director of Stanford’s the Michelle R. Clayman Institute for Gender Research.

During the Clinton administration, Rhode served as senior investigative counsel to the minority members of the U.S. House Committee on the Judiciary and advised them on presidential impeachment issues. More recently Rhode was the vice chair of the board of directors of Legal Momentum (formerly the National Organization for Women's Legal Defense and Education Fund) and was a columnist for The National Law Journal.

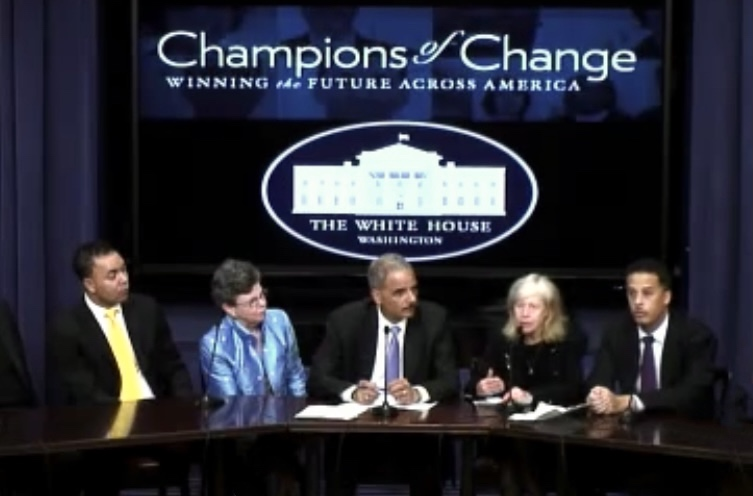
Deborah Rhode (second from right) speaks at the 2011 White House Champions of Change round table hosted by Eric Holder

Rhode received the American Bar Association's Outstanding Scholar Award; the American Bar Association's Michael Franck Professional Responsibility Award; the American Bar Foundation's W. M. Keck Foundation Award for distinguished scholarship on legal ethics; the American Bar Association's Pro Bono Publico Award; and the White House's 2011 Champion of Change Award for her work on access to justice. Rhode's scholarship also focused on gender equality; she argued that the implicit demand for women to wear makeup at the workplace is a form of "gender subordination". In 1991 article, she coined the term "The 'No-Problem' Problem" to describe the fundamental challenge, she argued, in advocating for women's rights was a problem of perception—the sense that a problem did not exist to need solving.

Rhode was an elected fellow of the American Academy of Arts and Sciences. She was also the most-cited legal scholar in legal ethics, as found in 2007 and 2015 studies, and was the third most-cited female legal scholar overall. A 2012 study identified Rhode as one of the 50 most relevant law professors in the United States.

=== Books ===
Rhode was the author of 30 books, dealing with a range of subjects in the fields of gender and the law, legal ethics and other concerns of the legal profession.

Rhode’s 1989 book Justice and Gender: Sex Discrimination and the Law was devoted to the exhaustive documentation of discrimination over the span of 200 years; the text was 321 pages long with another 107 pages of footnotes. It was a subject she returned to repeatedly in the course of her career, probing discrimination, the reasons it persisted and the possible paths to change. In her 1997 book, Speaking of Sex: The Denial of Gender Inequality, Rhode dealt with the issue that women's gains made advocating for the inequities that remained more difficult. She argued that recognition of the persisting gender gap was a necessary precondition for further progress. A New York Times reviewer found the book "scrupulously researched, balanced, sobering and sober", though worried that its "focus... on hard research rather than easy sensationalism" might lose the audience. Among Rhode’s novel solutions to some elements of gender discrimination was a proposal that discrimination on the basis of appearance should be subject to constitutional scrutiny, laid out in her 2010 book The Beauty Bias: The Injustice of Appearance in Life and Law.

Legal ethics and other aspects of the professional lives of lawyers figured significantly into her books as the object of critique and proposals for change. In 2000, Rhode published In the Interests of Justice: Reforming the Legal Profession. In a review for Legal Ethics, Barry Sullivan described Rhode's concern with the practice of law in the United States tackled in the book: that the legal profession "is insufficiently accountable to the public, that it falls far short of fulfilling its responsibilities to the society it ostensibly serves, that the best interests of its members are not well served by the current organisation and practices of the profession, that the membership of the profession is insufficiently diverse, and that the profession therefore requires radical reform."

Rhode drew praise as a prose stylist. In a review of her 2013 book Lawyers as Leaders, Daniel Reynolds wrote, "While the findings of social science can often seem cold and lifeless on the page, Professor Rhode manages to present them vividly: in every paragraph, in nearly every sentence, she offers telling examples or memorable quotations coloring the portrait of the successful leader and the failed one, too. From P.G. Wodehouse to Justice Thurgood Marshall, Erasmus of Rotterdam to Richard Nixon: reading Rhode is a rat-a-tat-tat of the mot juste, the perfect anecdote to be savored and saved for future use." The book grew out of her course on the subject.

== Personal life ==
In 1976, Rhode married Ralph Cavanagh, a senior attorney and co-director of Natural Resources Defense Council's energy program with whom she had attended college and law school.

She was an amateur photographer, persuading Thurgood Marshall to sit for portraits.

Rhode died at her home on January 8, 2021, at age 68.

== Selected publications ==
=== Books ===
- Rhode, Deborah L. (1989). Justice and Gender. Harvard University Press. ISBN 9780674042674. Preview.
- Rhode, Deborah L. (1997). Speaking of Sex. Harvard University Press. Preview.
- Rhode, Deborah L. (1998). Professional Responsibility: Ethics by the Pervasive Method (2nd ed.). Aspen. ISBN 9781567065428.
- Rhode, Deborah L. (2000). In the Interests of Justice. Oxford University Press. ISBN 978-0-19-512188-9.
- Rhode, Deborah L. (2004). Access to Justice. Oxford University Press.
- Rhode, Deborah L. (2005). Pro Bono in Principle and in Practice: Public Service and the Profession. Stanford University Press.
- Rhode, Deborah L. (2006). Moral Leadership: The Theory and Practice of Power, Judgment, and Policy. Jossey Bass. ISBN 9780787982829. Preview. Preview from Stanford.
- Rhode, Deborah L. (2006). In Pursuit of Knowledge: Scholars, Status, and Academic Culture. Stanford University Press.
- Rhode, Deborah L. (2010). Gender Law and Policy. Aspen Press. Details.
- Rhode, Deborah L. (2010). The Beauty Bias: The Injustice of Appearance in Life and Law. Oxford: Oxford University Press. ISBN 9780195372878. Preview from Stanford. Preview from Oxford University Press. Article: Dallas News.
- Rhode, Deborah L. (2013). Lawyers as Leaders. Oxford University Press.
- Rhode, Deborah L. (2014). What Women Want: An Agenda for the Women's Movement. Oxford University Press.
- Rhode, Deborah L. (2015). The Trouble with Lawyers. Oxford University Press.
- Rhode, Deborah L. (2017). Cheating: Ethics in Everyday Life. Oxford University Press.

=== Journal articles ===
- Rhode, Deborah L. (1981). "Why the ABA Bothers: A Functional Perspective on Professional Codes". Texas Law Review. 59: 689.
- Rhode, Deborah L. (1981). "Policing the Professional Monopoly: A Constitutional and Empirical Analysis of Unauthorized Practice Prohibitions". Stanford Law Review. 34 (1): 1–112. doi:10.2307/1228512. JSTOR 1228512.
- Rhode, Deborah L. (1982). "Class Conflicts in Class Actions". Stanford Law Review. 34 (6): 1183–1262. doi:10.2307/1228362. JSTOR 1228362.
- Rhode, Deborah L. (1985). "Moral Character as a Professional Credential". The Yale Law Journal. 94 (3): 491–603. doi:10.2307/796236. JSTOR 796236.
- Rhode, Deborah L. (1985). "Ethical Perspectives on Legal Practice". Stanford Law Review. 37 (2): 589–652. doi:10.2307/1228628. JSTOR 1228628.
- Rhode, Deborah L. (1990). "Feminist Critical Theories". Stanford Law Review. 42 (3): 617–638. doi:10.2307/1228887. JSTOR 1228887.
- Rhode, Deborah L. (1991). "The "No-Problem" Problem: Feminist Challenges and Cultural Change". The Yale Law Journal. 100 (6): 1731–1793. doi:10.2307/796785. JSTOR 796785.
- Rhode, Deborah L. (Fall 1991). "Enough said". Yale Journal of Law and Feminism. 4 (1). Yale Law School: 35–38.Pdf.
- Rhode, Deborah L. (2001). "Access to Justice". Fordham Law Review. 69: 1785–1819.
- Cummings, Scott L.; Rhode, Deborah L. (2009). "Public Interest Litigation: Insights from Theory and Practice". Fordham Urban Law Journal. 36: 603.
- Rhode, Deborah L.; Cummings, Scott L. (April 2010). "Managing pro bono: doing well by doing better". Fordham Law Review. 78 (5). Fordham University School of Law: 2357–2442. SSRN 1580263. Pdf.
- Rhode, Deborah L. (May 3, 2010). "Prejudiced toward pretty". National Law Journal. Tom Larranaga. p. 34. Abstract from Stanford Law School.

== See also ==
- List of law clerks for the tenth seat of the Supreme Court of the United States
