= Adam Goldstein (author) =

American author (born 1988)

Adam Goldstein (born January 22, 1988, in South Orange, New Jersey) is an American author, who started his own online software company GoldfishSoft at age 14 and wrote alongside David Pogue for The Missing Manual series at the age of 16.

== Biography ==
A graduate of The Pingry School and MIT, he co-founded travel startup Hipmunk with Reddit co-founder Steve Huffman in 2010. Goldstein served as CEO of Hipmunk from June 2010 through December 2018.

Goldstein has served at the Chief Technology Officer for BookTour.com, which he co-founded along with Chris Anderson and Kevin Smokler.

While still at MIT, Goldstein was President of the American Parliamentary Debate Association and a member of the Tau Epsilon Phi fraternity.

== Bibliography ==
- AppleScript: The Missing Manual
- Switching to the Mac: The Missing Manual, Tiger Edition (with David Pogue)
