= Ritu Birla =

Indian historian

- Born: India
- Occupation: Historian
- Awards: Chancellor Jackman Research Fellowship from the Jackman Humanities Institute; 2010 Stansky Book Prize; Kellett Fellowship (on which she received a second BA from Cambridge University); Presidential Teaching Award from Columbia University; Rini Ghosh Arts and Science Excellence in Teaching Award

Education
- Education: Columbia University (BA, PhD); University of Cambridge (MA)

Philosophical work
- Institutions: University of Toronto
- Main interests: South Asian history and colonial studies; global histories of capitalism and genealogies of modernity
- Notable works: Stages of Capital

Ritu Birla is an historian of modern South Asia. She is an associate Professor of History and is formerly the Richard Charles Lee Director of the Asian Institute and former Director of the Centre for South Asian Studies at the Munk School of Global Affairs & Public Policy at the University of Toronto.

== Work ==
After receiving her BA summa cum laude from Columbia College, Columbia University in 1987 she travelled to the University of Cambridge on a Euretta J. Kellett Fellowship for a second BA and MA, before returning to Columbia for her PhD. Her research is centred on capitalism and culture, colonial/postcolonial studies, legal history, as well as critical/gendered approaches to social/political theory.

Her book Stages of Capital: Law, Culture and Market Governance in Late Colonial India was the winner of the 2010 Stansky Book Prize (formerly the Albion Prize, awarded by the North American Conference on British Studies). She is recognized for bringing empirical studies of India to current questions in social and political theory, her research has also brought forth new questions of the global study of capitalism and its forms of governing. Thomas R. Metcalf notes:

Rarely have historians endeavored to include studies of indigenous mercantile capitalism in their accounts of colonial India. In this ambitious, excitingly original work, the kin-based mercantile firm, embedded in the undivided Hindu joint family, takes center stage in the creation of a modern India...[bringing] together economics, law, and history in a powerful vision that shapes afresh our understanding of capitalism and colonialism.

In Stages of Capital Birla looks at the relationship between gambling (like rain gambling) and speculation as one of the legal sites of the emergence of a market-economy under the British Raj. Speculation is currently one of her research focuses.

== Recognition and honours ==
The Jackman Humanities Institute acknowledged her current work in progress, Neoliberalism and Empire, solicited by Duke University Press for its new series Transactions: Economy, Finance and Theory, with the support from a Chancellor Jackman Research Fellowship.

Her book Stages of Capital has received over twenty-five reviews, in journals as wide-ranging as The Journal of Interdisciplinary History, The Law and Society Review, The Times of India, The Harvard Business History Review, The Journal of Economic History, and Studi Culturali (in Italian).

Birla has given many invited lectures at venues that include the Cambridge University World History and South Asia Seminars; the UC Santa Cruz Department of Feminist Studies; South Asia seminars at Oxford, Princeton and the University of Chicago; the UC Irvine School of Law; Columbia Law School, conference on Judith Butler's thought; the Harvard Program in the Study Capitalism; The Columbia Centre for Comparative Literature and Society's "Worlds of Capital" project; the Nehru Memorial Museum and Library, New Delhi; and Harvard Law School's Advanced Institute for Law and Global Policy. Birla has co-organized conferences in Johannesburg and Mumbai in 2009, and in December 2010, delivered the Godrej Archives Lecture in Mumbai, speaking on philanthropy and public culture in India. At the Kennedy Center for the Performing Arts in Washington, DC, in March 2011, she moderated a discussion on Gandhi and Tagore between the prominent global public intellectuals Gayatri Chakravorty Spivak and Ashis Nandy.

== Bibliography ==
Books

Stages of Capital: Law, Culture and Market Governance in Late Colonial India (2010)

Edited Volumes

- Co-edited special section, Speculation, in Comparative Studies of South Asia, Africa and the Middle East 35:3 (2015).
- "Postcolonial Studies: Now that's History" in Rosalind Morris, Ed. Can the Subaltern Speak?: Reflections on the History of an Idea (Columbia, 2010)
- "Vernacular Capitalists and the Modern Subject in India: Law, Cultural Politics and Market Ethics" in Anand Pandian and Daud Ali Eds. Ethical Life in South Asia (Indiana University, 2010)

Journal Articles

- "Speculation Illicit and Complicit: Contract, Uncertainty, and Governmentality," Comparative Studies of South Asia, Africa and the Middle East 35:3 (2015): 392–407.
- Guest Editor with Faisal Devji Public Culture "Itineraries of Self-Rule: Essays on the Centenary of Gandhi's Hind Swaraj"
- "Law as Economy: Convention, Corporation, Currency," Irvine Law Review (2012)
- "Performativity Between Logos and Nomos: Law, Temporality and the Non-Economic Analysis of Power," Columbia Journal of Gender and Law 90 (2011)
- "Might as well Face it, We're Addicted to Gandhi," Public Culture (2011)
- "History and the Critique of Postcolonial Reason Limits, Secret, Value," Interventions: International Journal of Postcolonial Studies (2002)
