= Matthew Mendelsohn =

Canadian public sector leader

- Born: Montreal, Quebec, Canada
- Education: McGill University, Université de Montréal
- Occupation: Visiting Professor
- Employer: Ryerson University

Matthew Mendelsohn is a Canadian public policy expert and public sector executive, best known for leading Prime Minister’s Justin Trudeau’s Results and Delivery Unit and the Government of Canada’s Impact and Innovation Unit from 2016 to 2020. These followed his role as a chief architect of the Liberals’ 2015 election platform and serving as a member of incoming Prime Minister Trudeau’s transition team, helping with cabinet selection and penning open and public Ministerial mandate letters.

He was the founding director of the Mowat Centre in 2009, a Canadian public policy think tank at the University of Toronto. He had previously served as a deputy minister in the Ontario Government and was a professor of Political Science at Queen’s University.

He is currently a visiting professor at Toronto Metropolitan University in Toronto after announcing his decision to leave the federal government in February 2020. He is also a Senior Advisor with Boston Consulting Group's Global Public Sector Practice. He lives in Toronto with his wife, Kirsten Mercer, a lawyer and a partner at Goldblatt Partners, and their two children.

== Early life ==
Mendelsohn grew up in Montreal, Canada. He graduated from West Hill High School, a public school in the Notre-Dame-de-Grace neighbourhood. He received a B.A. in political science from McGill University and a Ph.D. in political science from l’Université de Montréal. While attending university, Mendelsohn was president of the McGill Debating Union and the Canadian University Society for Intercollegiate Debate, and won the award for Top Speaker at the 1987 Canadian National Debating Championship and the third place speaker award at the World Championships at Fordham University in 1986.

== Academic career ==
Mendelsohn joined the Department of Political Studies at Queen’s University in 1992, following a post-doctoral fellowship at the University of British Columbia. He taught courses and published in the areas of Canadian Politics, quantitative research methods, public opinion and data analysis, democratic institutions, federalism, political communications and elections.

During his time at Queen’s, he was the chief architect of the Portraits of Canada survey conducted for the Centre for Research and Information on Canada, designed the survey for the Globe and Mail’s New Canada Project and served as the Director of the Canadian Opinion Research Archive.

== The Mowat Centre ==
Matthew founded the Mowat Centre in February 2009 in the School of Public Policy & Governance at the University of Toronto with $5M in seed funding from the Government of Ontario. The Mowat Centre had a mandate to advance evidence-based policy solutions relevant to Ontario and informed by issues facing the province.

By 2014, the Mowat Centre had 30 staff members and an annual operating budget of $2.5M, consisting of $900,000 in government and the rest in private funding. It was closed in 2018, three years after Mendelsohn’s departure, attracting media attention. The Munk Centre at the University of Toronto continues to maintain the Mowat Centre website.

== Public Service Career ==
=== Ontario Government ===
Mendelsohn was recruited by Premier Dalton McGuinty and Cabinet Secretary Tony Dean to head up the Democratic Renewal Secretariat in 2004. The main accomplishment of the DRS was the establishment of the Citizens’ Assembly on Electoral Reform. The Assembly was followed by a referendum on a proposal for a Mixed Member Proportional electoral system. The conduct of the referendum was widely criticized as being stacked against change, and the proposal went down to defeat.

Mendelsohn became Ontario’s Deputy Minister of Intergovernmental and International Affairs in 2005.

=== Federal Government ===
Mendelsohn led the polling unit for the Privy Council Office in the aftermath of the 1995 referendum, supporting federal efforts to pass the Calgary Declaration recognizing Quebec’s unique place in Canada, the Social Union Framework Agreement and the Supreme Court Reference on Quebec’s right to secede and the subsequent Clarity Act, outlining the obligations on the part of governments should Quebecers vote to secede from Canada.

Mendelsohn was appointed the first Deputy Secretary to the Cabinet for Results & Delivery in February 2015. Mendelsohn’s appointment was controversial because he had worked on the Liberal platform.

Mendelsohn’s work became closely associated with Sir Michael Barber’s “Deliverology” approach when Barber and Mendelsohn appeared at the Trudeau government’s first cabinet retreat. Mendelsohn continued to appear at all cabinet retreats, outlining the government’s progress on meeting it commitments.

In November 2017, the government released a public tracker reporting on its progress on mandate letters. Many editorialists were critical of the enterprise, finding the language too bureaucratic and disagreeing with some of the characterizations of whether commitments had been met or not. Mendelsohn himself dismissed these criticisms, insisting that tracking mandate letter commitments was an important part of transparency and accountability.

During his time in Ottawa, he was identified as one of the most powerful people in the government and referred to as ‘the policy guru’ while being the person responsible for ensuring the Government delivered on its campaign manifesto.

== Justin Trudeau Campaign ==
Mendelsohn took a leave from the Mowat Centre during the spring of 2015. Following the election campaign, he was appointed to Justin Trudeau’s transition team and was involved in Cabinet selection and responsible for penning most of the Ministerial Mandate Letters.

== Community Service and Volunteer Work ==
Mendelsohn has served on many not-for-profit boards, including the United Way Toronto, Civix, Civic Action, and Farm Radio International. He also served as the Chair of the Board for the Council of the Great Lakes Region. Mendelsohn was a founding member of the Banff Forum, speaking at the first two annual meetings and serving on the program committee. He is a certified member of the Institute of Corporate Directors.
