= Mowat Centre =

Canadian think tank

The Mowat Centre was an independent Canadian public policy think tank associated with the Munk School of Global Affairs and Public Policy at the University of Toronto. It was established in 2009 with support from the government of Ontario, and published its first report in February 2010. It closed in June 2019 after its funding agreement with the Government of Ontario was cancelled. It was named after Ontario's longest-serving Premier, Sir Oliver Mowat.

== About ==
The Mowat Centre described itself as "Ontario's non-partisan, evidence-based voice on public policy." It "undertakes collaborative applied policy research, proposes innovative research-driven recommendations, and engages in public dialogue on Canada's most important national issues."

Academic experts the Mowat Centre collaborated with include Robin Boadway, Sujit Choudhry, Tom Courchene, and others. Organizations Mowat collaborated with include the Atlantic Provinces Economic Council, the Broadbent Institute, the Brookings Institution, the Caledon Institute of Social Policy, the Canada West Foundation, Corporate Knights, KPMG, Leger Marketing, and others.

According to a 2015 report analyzing its own policy impact and public footprint, the Mowat Centre played a role in the passage of the Fair Representation Act 2011 and reforms made to policy proposals that led to the Canada Job Grant and income splitting in Canada. According to the same report, in the years 2010 through 2014 the Mowat Centre published 101 reports, was mentioned in 1317 media reports, and was referenced 59 times in policy reports and 87 times in academic research.

== Research ==
The Mowat Centre's research focused on two areas: intergovernmental economic and social policy and government transformation. In addition, The Mowat Centre was home to three research hubs, two of which have also closed. One was focused on energy policy in Ontario and Canada. The other was focused on education and skills. A third research hub, focused on the not-for-profit sector in Ontario and Canada, remains active.

In the area of intergovernmental economic and social policy, the Mowat Centre published research into policy areas such as Canadian transfer payments, equalization payments in Canada, fiscal federalism in Canada, intergovernmental relations in Canada, poverty reduction and social programs in Canada, Canada's Employment Insurance program, Canada's immigration system and the economic impact of immigrants in Canada, Canadians’ attitudes towards the Canadian federation, the distribution of electoral ridings in Canada, the economy of Ontario and Canada and others.

The Mowat Centre also led the Mowat Centre EI Task Force, a task force of leading experts and public figures co-chaired by Ratna Omidvar and Roy Romanow, which reviewed Canada's Employment Insurance (EI) system, conducted public consultations about its relevance to contemporary realities, commissioned research on various aspects of the system from leading Canadian academic experts, and made recommendations about improving Canada's support system for the unemployed.

In the area of government transformation, the Mowat Centre published work examining "how governments can improve their ability to deliver high-quality public services and public policy, even in times of fiscal constraint", through public service reform. Issues have included improvements to the health care system in Canada, the integration of human services, outcomes-based funding, insights for governments from behavioural science, the regulation of disruptive technologies, the role of government procurement [lxviii] in poverty reduction, community benefits agreements and other topics.

Mowat NFP, Mowat's research hub focused on the not-for-profit sector, published research on human capital and capacity building in the not-for-profit sector, social enterprises, social impact bonds, data priorities for the not-for-profit sector, wages in the not-for-profit sector and other topics.

Mowat Energy, Mowat's research hub focused on energy policy, published research on energy security, energy R&D funding, social license and public engagement in energy policy decisions, an analysis of the economic impact [lxxxiv] on Ontario of the Energy East proposal, and carbon pricing in Canada.

== Other activities ==
In addition to public policy research, the Mowat Centre engages in a variety of public policy knowledge transfer and convening activities. In 2010 it co-organized, with the Institute of Intergovernmental Relations, the 2010 State of the Federation conference. In 2011 the Mowat Centre co-organized, with the Brookings Institution, the Windsor-Detroit summit. Following the summit, the Mowat Centre took a leading role in creating the Council of the Great Lakes Region, which was launched in 2013. Mowat has since collaborated with the Council of the Great Lakes Region on several research projects.

== Leadership and funding ==
The Mowat Centre's founding director was Matthew Mendelsohn. Mendelsohn is a former political science professor at Queens University and a former Deputy Minister in the Ontario Public Service, and has advised governments and political candidates on various policy matters, drawing on his academic expertise as well as Mowat research. He left the Mowat Centre in January 2016 for a senior position with the Public Service of Canada.

The Mowat Centre was established with funding from the Ontario government. According to the Mowat Centre's public reports, the core grant constitutes less than 40% of the Centre's annual funding ($900,000 out of a total budget of $2,289,410 in fiscal year 2014-2015), with the remainder of its funding raised independently.

The Mowat Centre's advisory board is composed of experts, education and policy leaders, and public figures, and includes former Ontario cabinet ministers from all major parties: Sean Conway, Joseph Cordiano, Dianne Cunningham, and Frances Lankin. Among other members of the Mowat Centre's advisory board are Alan Broadbent, Lisa De Wilde, Tony Dean, Dominic Giroux, John Honderich, Shirley Hoy, Danielle Martin, and André Pratte.

== Related reading ==
- Tapp, Stephen (2015). What Can a Little Birdie Tell Us About Think Tank Ideology.
- Banting, Keith and Jon Medow (2012). Making EI Work: Research from the Mowat Centre Employment Insurance Task Force. ISBN 978-1-55339-323-8.
- Mendelsohn, Matthew, Joshua Hjartarson and James Pearce (2013). Shifting Power: The New Ontario and What it Means for Canada. ISBN 978-1-55339-200-2.
- The Mowat Centre (December 2015). Impact Report 2010-2015.
