= North American Debating Championship =

University debate championship

The North American Debating Championship is one of the two official university debate championships of North America. It is sanctioned by the national university debating associations in the United States and Canada, the American Parliamentary Debate Association and the Canadian University Society for Intercollegiate Debate. It has been held each winter on an alternating basis between the United States and Canada since 1992. The host university arranges all judging and is not allowed in the competition. The most frequent hosts have been the University of Toronto and McGill University, which have each hosted the championship three times. Bates College, Cornell University, Johns Hopkins University, and Queen's University have each hosted twice. This tournament, often abbreviated as NorthAms, is not to be confused with the North American Universities Debating Championship, abbreviated as NAUDC, which is hosted separately in the fall of each year as a British Parliamentary Style tournament. The two events are coordinated such that each is hosted by a different country, the United States or Canada, in a given year.

The most recent iteration was held by Dartmouth College in January 2026. The current North American champions are from Stanford University.

== Results ==
Since 1992, the most successful university overall has been Yale University with nine championship victories, including three of the last four. Following it is the University of Toronto with seven wins. After that, Princeton University, the Massachusetts Institute of Technology, Harvard University and McGill University have two championships each, and no other university has won more than once.

No team has ever repeated as the top team at the championship. Five individuals have won the top team award twice. Most recently, Matthew Song won in 2022 and 2024, representing Yale University. Matthew Wansley of Yale University won back-to-back championships from 2005 to 2007. Prior to that, Nathan MacDonald and Robert Silver won first together for the University of Western Ontario in 1997–1998, then MacDonald for the University of Guelph in 1998–1999, and Silver for the University of Ottawa in 1999–2000. Three people have won the top individual debater award twice: Casey Halladay of the University of Ottawa in 1997–1998 and 1999–2000, Rory Gillis of Yale University in two consecutive years from 2004 to 2006, and Kate Falkenstien of Yale in two consecutive years from 2010 to 2012.

Year	Host	Champion Team	College	Top Debater	College
2026	(United States) Dartmouth	Claire Beamer & Tejas Subramaniam	(United States) Stanford	Tejas Subramaniam	(United States) Stanford University
2025	(Canada) Odette	Alessandro Perri & Roy Tiefer	(United States) UChicago	Elizabeth Li	(United States) Stanford University
2024	(United States) UChicago	Justin Kim & Matthew Song	(United States) Yale	Ryan Lafferty	(United States) Dartmouth College
2023	(Canada) Western	Ye Joo Han & Matt Mauriello	(United States) Harvard	Matt Mauriello	(United States) Harvard University
2022	(United States) Brandeis	Cameron Chacon & Matthew Song	(United States) Yale	Devesh Kodnani	(United States) University of Chicago
2021	(United States) Penn	David Edimo & Eva Quinones	(United States) Yale	Eva Quinones	(United States) Yale
2020	(Canada) Waterloo	Gautier Boyrie & Chris Pang	(Canada) Toronto	Samuel Arnesen and Shreyas Kumar	(United States) Princeton
2019	(United States) Rutgers	William Arnesen & Xavier Sottile	(United States) Yale	Sophia Caldera	(United States) Harvard
2018	(Canada) Toronto	Harry Elliott & David Slater	(United States) Stanford	Christopher Taylor	(United States) Yale
2017	(United States) Middlebury	Megan Wilson & Kyle Hietala	(United States) Yale	Nathan Raab	(United States) Princeton
2016	(Canada) Queen's	Anirudh Dasarathy & Brian Litchfield	(United States) Princeton	Denizhan Uykur	(Canada) McGill
2015	(United States) NYU	Juliana Vigorito & David Israel	(United States) Hopkins	Shomik Ghosh	(United States) Michigan
2014	(Canada) Ottawa & Carleton	Kaya Ellis & Louis Tsilivis	(Canada) Toronto	Michael Barton and Veenu Goswami	(United States) Yale and (Canada) Toronto
2013	(United States) Syracuse	Coulter King & Josh Zoffer	(United States) Harvard	Coulter King	(United States) Harvard
2012	(Canada) Toronto	Simon Cameron & Romeo Maione	(Canada) Carleton	Kate Falkenstien	(United States) Yale
2011	(United States) Fordham	Nate Blevins & Pam Brown	(United States) Yale	Kate Falkenstien	(United States) Yale
2010	(Canada) York	Adam Goldstein & Bill Magnuson	(United States) MIT	Richard Lizius	(Canada) Toronto
2009	(United States) Amherst	Grant May & Andrew Rohrbach	(United States) Yale	Mark Samburg	(United States) Harvard
2008	(Canada) Carleton	Jon Laxer & Jason Rogers	(Canada) Toronto	Josh Bone	(United States) Yale
2007	(United States) Bates	Dylan Gadek & Matthew Wansley	(United States) Yale	Ian Freeman	(Canada) Carleton
2006	(Canada) Toronto	Ben Eidelson & Matthew Wansley	(United States) Yale	Rory Gillis	(United States) Yale
2005	(United States) Cornell	Joanna Nairn & Melanie Tharamangalam	(Canada) Toronto	Rory Gillis	(United States) Yale
2004	(Canada) Queen's	James Renihan & Gordon Shotwell	(Canada) McGill	Greg Allen	(Canada) UBC
2003	(United States) Hopkins	Phil Larochelle & Patrick Nichols	(United States) MIT	Emily Schleicher	(United States) NYU
2002	(Canada) McGill	Rory McKeown & Aaron Rousseau	(Canada) Toronto	Ranjan Agarwal	(Canada) Ottawa
2001	(United States) Cornell	Storey Clayton & Adam Zirkin	(United States) Brandeis	David Silverman	(United States) Princeton
2000	(Canada) Queen's	Casey Halladay & Robert Silver	(Canada) Ottawa	Casey Halladay	(Canada) Ottawa
1999	(United States) Smith	Nathan MacDonald & Averill Pessin	(Canada) Guelph	Jason Goldman	(United States) Princeton
1998	(Canada) McGill	Nathan MacDonald & Robert Silver	(Canada) Western	Casey Halladay	(Canada) Ottawa
1997	(United States) Hopkins	John Oleske & Niall O'Murchada	(United States) Princeton	John Oleske	(United States) Princeton
1996	(Canada) Toronto	Matt Cohen & Jamie Springer	(Canada) McGill	Ron Guirguis	(Canada) Guelph
1995	(United States) Penn	Jeremy Mallory & Neal Potishman	(United States) Swarthmore	Michael D'Abramo	(Canada) Toronto
1994	(Canada) Dalhousie	Randy Cass & Avery Plaw	(Canada) Toronto	Avery Plaw	(Canada) Toronto
1993	(United States) Bates	Jason Brent & Thomas Meehan	(Canada) Toronto	Marc Givens	(Canada) Queen's
1992	(Canada) McGill	Marc Givens & Elicia Maine	(Canada) Queen's	Ted Cruz	(United States) Princeton

== North American Public Speaking Championship ==
Every year from 1992 to 2001, and biannually from 2003 to 2007, individual public speaking was also an event at the championship. It was run as a parallel tournament, with a grand public speaking final before the final round of debate. After 2007, it was discontinued as APDA had shortened debating tournaments and discontinued public speaking as a regular event at US tournaments. No individual ever repeated as North American Public Speaking Champion. McGill University and the University of Ottawa each had three public speaking champions, the most of any university.

Year	Winner	College
2007	Vinay Kumar Mysore	(Canada) McGill University
2005	Jason Rogers	(Canada) McGill University
2004	Stuart Savelkoul	(United States) Dickinson State University
2001	Aidan Johnson	(Canada) University of Toronto
2000	Jeremy Holiday	(United States) Middlebury College
1999	Mark Bigney	(Canada) McGill University
1998	Michael Podgorski	(Canada) Queen's University
1997	Jordan Mills	(United States) University of New Mexico
1996	Shuman Ghosemajumder	(Canada) University of Western Ontario
1995	Marika Giles	(Canada) Concordia University
1994	Jake Irving	(Canada) University of Ottawa
1993	Michael McKneely	(United States) Colgate University
1992	Awanish Sinha	(Canada) University of Ottawa
