= Yale Debate Association =

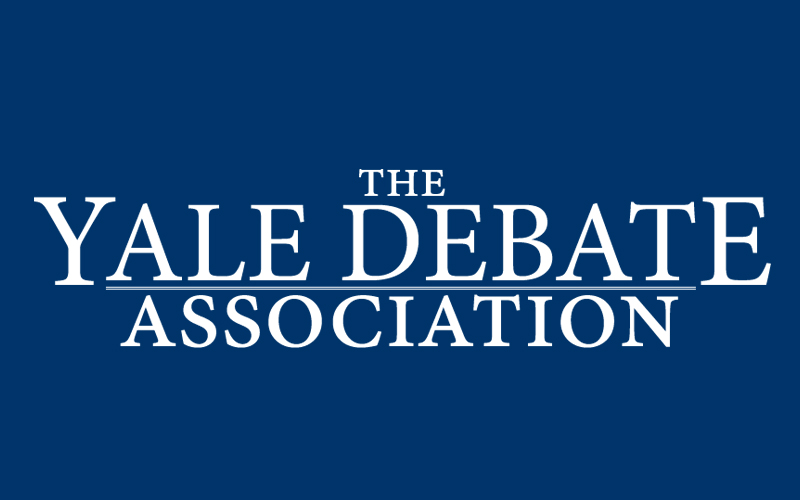
- Formation: 1908
- President: Justin Kim
- Affiliations: Yale University
- Website: www.yaledebate.org

The Yale Debate Association (YDA) is Yale University's only competitive intercollegiate debate team. Founded in 1908, it is the most prolific winner of the American Parliamentary Debate Association's Club of the Year award. The YDA was also the first American team to win and have the top speaker at the modern World Championships. Currently, the YDA is the fourth-ranked collegiate debate society in the world, and as of January 2024, the highest ranked in North America.

== History ==
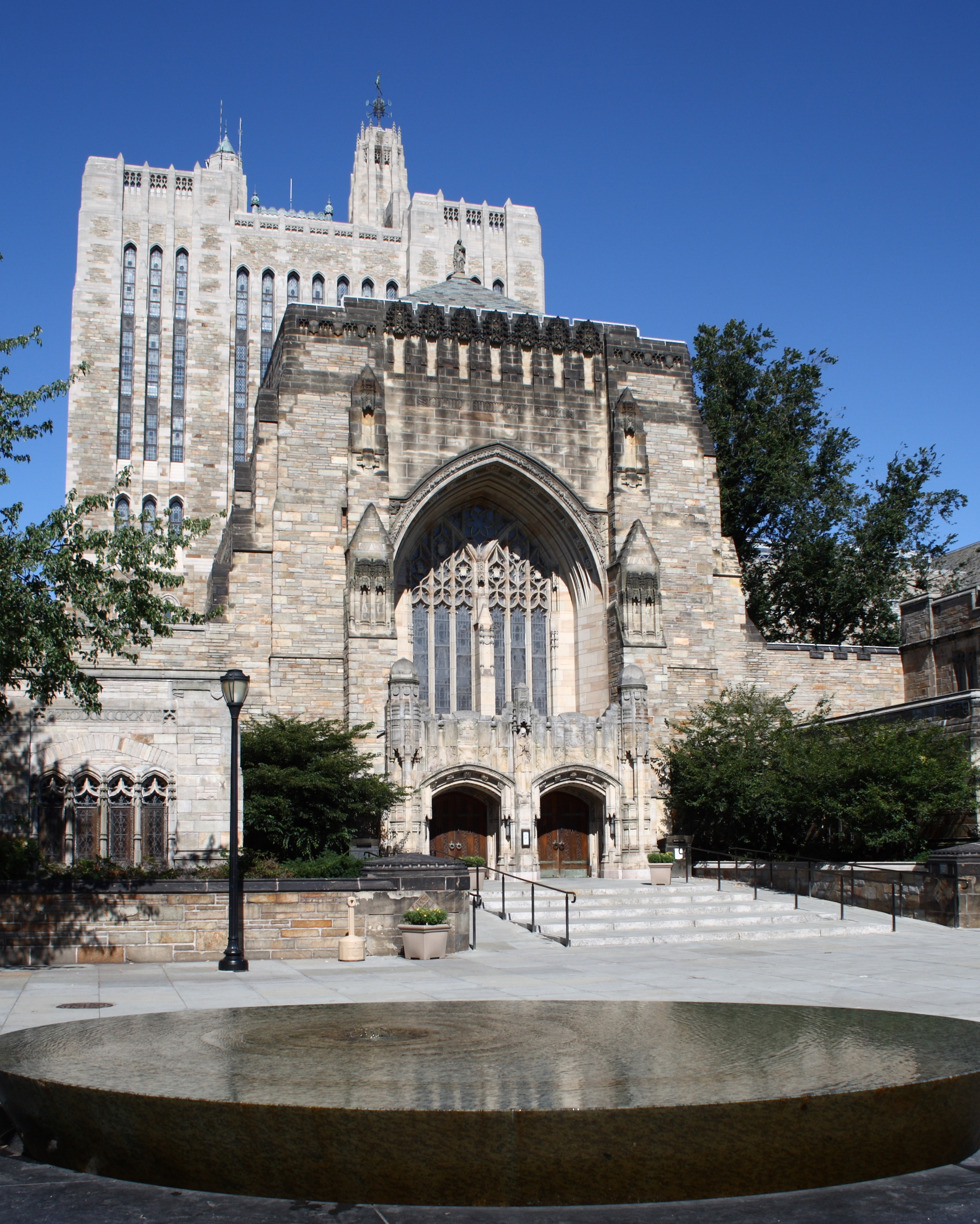
Yale's Sterling Memorial Library, location of the YDA Records

Founded in 1908, the Yale Debate Association initially hosted debates with Harvard and Princeton three times a year. Teams of three students each debated topics that covered a wide range of issues. Prominent officials— from judges, to university presidents, and even former United States president Grover Cleveland— determined the winners of each round. The debates were open to the public, free of charge, and drew large crowds on campus. The New York Times reported that “It is generally as important to win this debate [Yale v. Harvard] as to win the football match in the fall.”

In 1922, Yale helped create an intercollegiate debate league with eight other institutions. The league grew to a national level when West Point hosted an open tournament in 1947.

The YDA's most recent style of debate began with the creation of the American Parliamentary Debate Association (APDA) in 1982. The format of parliamentary debate differs from those used by earlier leagues; teams consist of two debaters rather than three, and the order of the speeches is structured differently. The team continues to compete in APDA today.

=== Coaches ===
The YDA has had two official faculty coaches. The first, John Chester Adams graduated from Yale in 1886 and coached the team from when he began teaching in 1914 to his retirement in 1941. The annual Adams Cup Debate Tournament between residential colleges at Yale is named in his honor. The second, professor of history and oratory Rollin G. Osterweis, coached the team after Adams’ retirement until his own in 1979. Former students of Osterweis include 2004 presidential candidates John Kerry and George Bush. "Rollie Osterweis, who coached the debaters, always said that Bill Buckley and John Kerry were the best speakers he'd ever worked with," Yale graduate Harvey Bundy told The New York Times in 2004. Among those who acted as assistant coaches under Osterweis was John O'Leary, then a student at the law school and later the United States Ambassador to Chile. As noted below, the team now hosts a tournament for local Connecticut schools in memory of Rollin Osterweis.

== Structure ==
The Yale Debate Association is run by a board of students who are elected by the team as a whole each year. This board is entrusted to handle nearly all responsibilities associated with running the team. Currently, the Executive Board consists of five members: the President, the Director of Development, the Director of Membership, the Tournament Coordinator, and the Treasurer.

YDA membership is competitive and tryouts are held in the beginning of Yale's fall semester for those wishing to join the team. Once admitted, members remain on the team for the remainder of their time at Yale. The team consists of roughly 40-50 members.

== National Competition ==
The Yale Debate Association primarily competes in the American Parliamentary style of debate as a member of the American Parliamentary Debate Association, which is an intercollegiate debate association with dozens of member universities across the United States. The YDA competes weekly at tournaments throughout the country.

Members of the team have also been active in the governance of the league, including election to the executive board of APDA. YDA members who have served as President of APDA include Andrew Rohrbach (2008–2009), Andrew Korn (2004–2005), and Scott Luftglass (2000–2001).

== International Competition ==
In addition to competition within APDA, the YDA competes internationally. The YDA competes at the North American Debating Championships, at the World Universities Debating Championships, and at other Inter-Varsity debate tournaments. Currently, the YDA is ranked as the best collegiate debate organization in the world, ahead of the University of Sydney Union and the Oxford Union, according to the ranking methodology developed by iDebate, a major debating news website.

The World Universities Debating Championships (WUDC) is conducted in the British Parliamentary style of debate. The YDA competes annually at WUDC and has had more top speakers at WUDC than any other American university, and was the first team from the United States to reach the WUDC final round.

Teams from across the United States and Canada attend the annual North American Championships. The style of debate is similar to American parliamentary, however speeches are shortened. As of January 2024, the YDA has won the tournament nine times, more than any other American team.

In addition to these tournaments, the YDA competes at the Oxford and Cambridge Inter-varsity tournaments. Yale debaters won the Oxford Invitational most recently in 2009, as well as in 2006 (Yale also won the Cambridge Invitational in 2006)

== Tournaments Hosted by the YDA ==
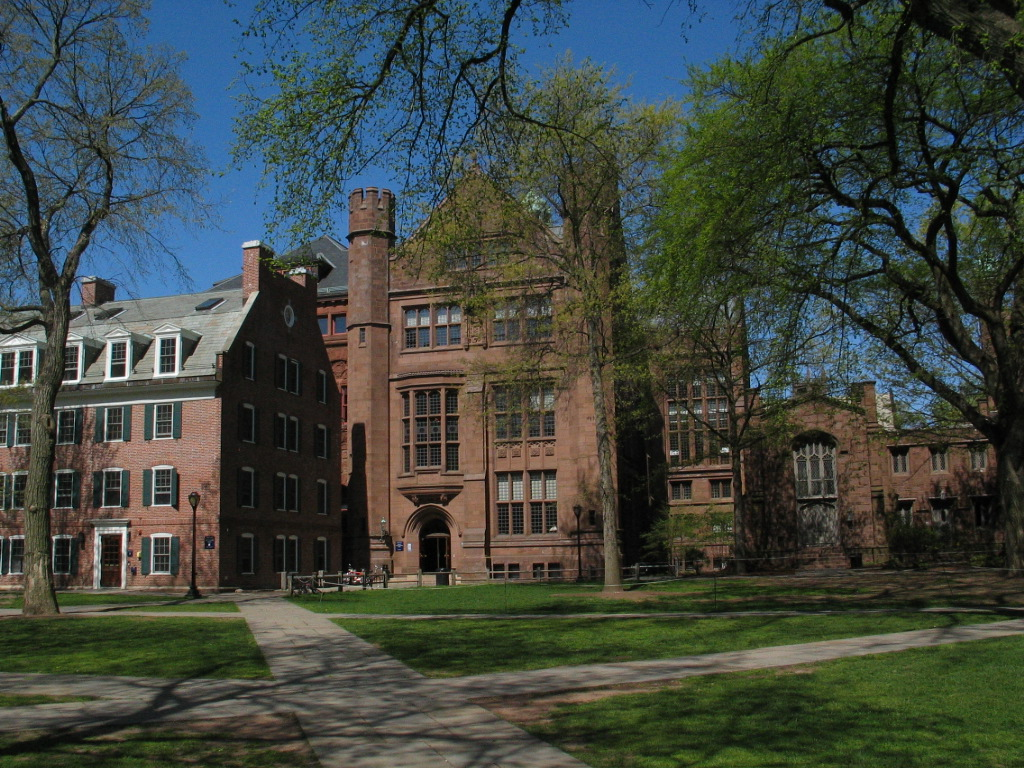
Linsly-Chittenden Hall on Old Campus, the building where the YDA hosts many of its tournaments and public debates.

=== The Yale High School Invitational ===
The Yale Invitational is a nationwide National Speech and Debate Association (NSDA) tournament for high school students. Students come from across the country to compete in twelve events. Traditionally, quarter-finalists in Varsity Lincoln-Douglas, octo-finalists in Public Forum Debate, and Congressional Debate Super Session participants earn a bid to the Tournament of Champions.

The Yale Invitational has been hosted on Yale University's campus every fall since 1993. The organizational aspects of the tournament are entirely run by student members of the YDA. The competition itself is directed by a core of experienced coaches who are familiar with tabulation and tournament direction.

=== The Yale Inter-Varsity (IV) ===
The Yale Inter-Varsity Debate Tournament is an annual international debate tournament for college students held in British Parliamentary (BP) style. It was first held in 2006. The organizational aspects of the tournament are run by members of the YDA. The adjudication team is led by a Chief Adjudicator and Deputy Chief Adjudicator, both of which are often current or former team members. The Yale IV was the only British Parliamentary tournament held by a team that is part of the American Parliamentary Debate Association until Fall 2012, with the inaugural Brandeis IV.

=== Triangulars ===
Yale continues to debate Harvard and Princeton in the annual tradition of the Triangulars debates. The competition began near the end of the 19th century as an ad-hoc debate against Harvard. A more formal association began in 1908, when Yale joined forces with Harvard and Princeton to hold annual debates called “Triangulars” that would discuss current political and economic affairs. The debates gained national attention and were attended by high-level officials and large audiences. Today, the YDA continues this tradition by fielding two three-member teams to debate both the Harvard and Princeton delegations every year.

=== Osterweis ===
Founded in 1980, The Rollin G. Osterweis Tournament is a free tournament for high school students in Connecticut. The tournament includes a demonstration round from four current debaters and a training session for current high school debaters. The tournament is named after YDA Coach Rollin G. Osterweis and is funded by Jonathan Edwards College in coordination with the Rollin G. Osterweis Fund.

=== Adams ===
The YDA also runs the Adams Cup, an intramural debate tournament between the residential colleges at Yale. The tournament features students from Yale's fourteen residential colleges; the winner keeps the rotating trophy until the next year's tournament. The YDA voted to discontinue the Adams Cup after its 2022 edition.

== Alumni ==
President William H. Taft, alumnus

As one of the oldest debating institutions in the United States, the YDA has developed a large alumni community. Famous alumni have included 2004 presidential candidate John Kerry, President and Chief Justice of the Supreme Court William Howard Taft and publisher and journalist William F. Buckley. Other former Yale debate team members include conservative writer and activist L. Brent Bozell, Jr., Stanford Law School professor Deborah Rhode, Yale Law School professor Akhil Reed Amar, Writer and commentator David Frum, Yale professor Tamar Gendler, Economist Austan Goolsbee, Writer Dahlia Lithwick, National Security Advisor Jake Sullivan and environmental attorney Ralph Cavanagh. The YDA recently celebrated its 100th anniversary with the Centennial Reunion in October 2008, where the Yale Association for Debate Alumni was formally created.

=== Centennial Reunion ===
Over one hundred current and former members of the team attended the Centennial Reunion in October 2008. The event included demonstration debates by former members of the YDA, as well as an alumni debate and a humorous debate, in addition to presentations demonstrating the current structure of the team. The event also paid tribute to the late coach of the YDA, Rollin Osterweis.

=== Yale Association for Debate Alumni (YADA) ===
YADA was founded in October 2008 to serve as a community for former members of the YDA. The organization holds social gatherings for alumni members and serves as a mechanism for current YDA members to contact former members of the team.

== Service ==
In addition to its usual activities, the YDA is a partner organization of the New Haven Urban Debate League, which seeks to provide the local community with the opportunity to participate in the activity of debate. The NHUDL provides weekly coaching lessons to local area high school and middle school students, as well as three charity tournaments in each semester. The program has expanded from its inception in 2004 to include 14 public schools in New Haven.

== Public Appearances ==
=== The PETA Debate ===
On March 31, 2010 Bruce Friedrich, Vice President of Policy for People for the Ethical Treatment of Animals (PETA) came to Yale to debate two YDA members on whether it is ethical to eat animals. Friedrich has debated meat, fur, and animal-experimentation industry representatives on many television and radio programs, including NBC's Today show as well as other programs on stations including CNN and MSNBC. The YDA defended eating animals.

=== The Yale-Howard Debate ===
Yale University and Howard University held a joint event in 2009 and in 2010 that was sponsored by the NAACP and YDA. The debates centered on several topics addressing important questions facing the United States with relation to race and equality. The event's style is shortened parliamentary and no winner is named. The 2009 and 2010 Yale-Howard Debates were attended by over 2,700 people in Woolsey Hall on Yale University Campus. The audience also included prominent figures of the Yale administration.

=== The VH1 "Great Debate" ===
Over the summer of 2009, the YDA participated in an exhibition debate in the middle of Harold Square in New York City against the Harvard team debating various pop culture topics. Part of this debate was later shown on VH1 news.

== National Awards ==
Over the past 25 years, members of the YDA have received many awards for their performances throughout the course of a season in the American Parliamentary Debate Association. Since APDA's founding, six Yale teams have won the Team of the Year award, granted annually to the league's top performing team of two individuals. The league also gives the Speaker of the Year (SOTY) award, presented every year to its highest-ranked individual debater. YDA members have won this award six times in total. Finally, the Novice of the Year (NOTY) award, given annually to APDA's top performing first-year debater, has been awarded to Yale debaters four times.

== See also ==
- List of Yale University student organizations
- Yale Political Union
- The Model United Nations Team at Yale
- Yale University

== Related ==
- Oxford Union
- Cambridge Union Society
- Stubbs Society
- The Durham Union Society
- College Historical Society
- Berkeley Forum
- Olivaint Conference of Belgium
