= Munk School of Global Affairs & Public Policy =

Global affairs and policy school at the University of Toronto

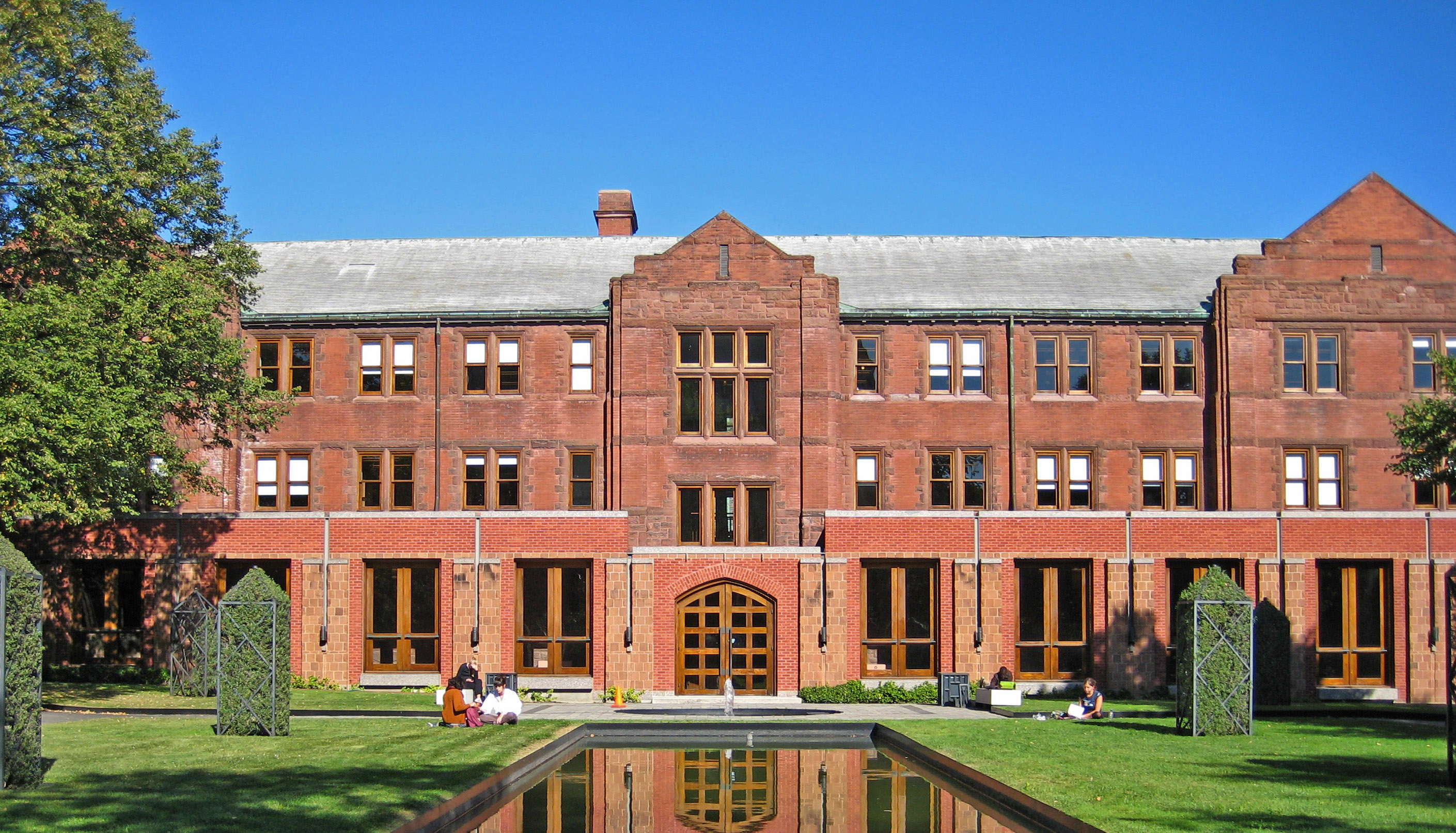
- Devonshire House, the Munk School's original location, at Trinity College
- Established: 2000; 26 years ago
- Parent institution: University of Toronto Faculty of Arts and Science
- Affiliations: APSIA
- Director: Janice Stein
- Academic staff: 230
- Students: 1,200
- Location: Toronto, Ontario, Canada; 43°39′53″N 79°23′47″W
- Named for: Peter Munk
- Website: munkschool.utoronto.ca

The Munk School of Global Affairs & Public Policy (often referred to as simply the Munk School) is the public policy school at the University of Toronto. An extra-departmental unit (EDU) of the Faculty of Arts and Science, it is based on the St. George campus in downtown Toronto, Ontario, Canada.

The school offers various research and graduate educational programs in global affairs and public policy studies. The school is a member of the Association of Professional Schools of International Affairs (APSIA), a group of schools that educate students in international affairs. The Munk School's Master of Global Affairs program typically receives 500 and 600 applicants per year and offers 80 students entry into its program.

The Munk School is located in the north and south wings of the Devonshire House building on Devonshire Place, which is situated in Trinity College's John W. Graham Library on the St. George campus. In 2012, the school opened a second location in the Observatory building at 315 Bloor Street West (formerly the university's Admissions and Awards building), which is the offices of the Citizen Lab and the Master of Global Affairs program. The Master of Public Policy is headquartered at the Canadiana Gallery next to the Legislature of Ontario.

== History ==
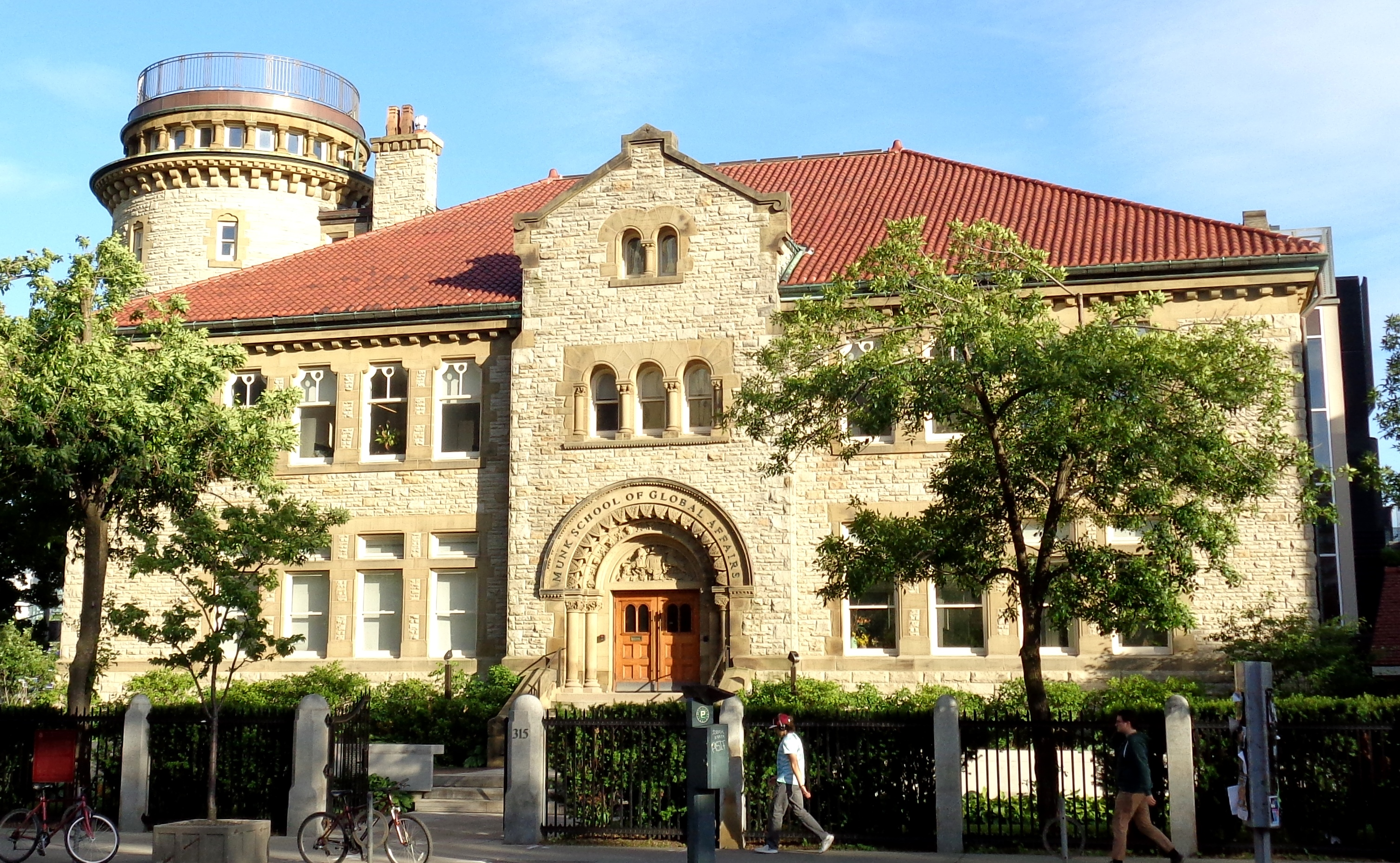
The Munk School's secondary building at 315 Bloor Street West

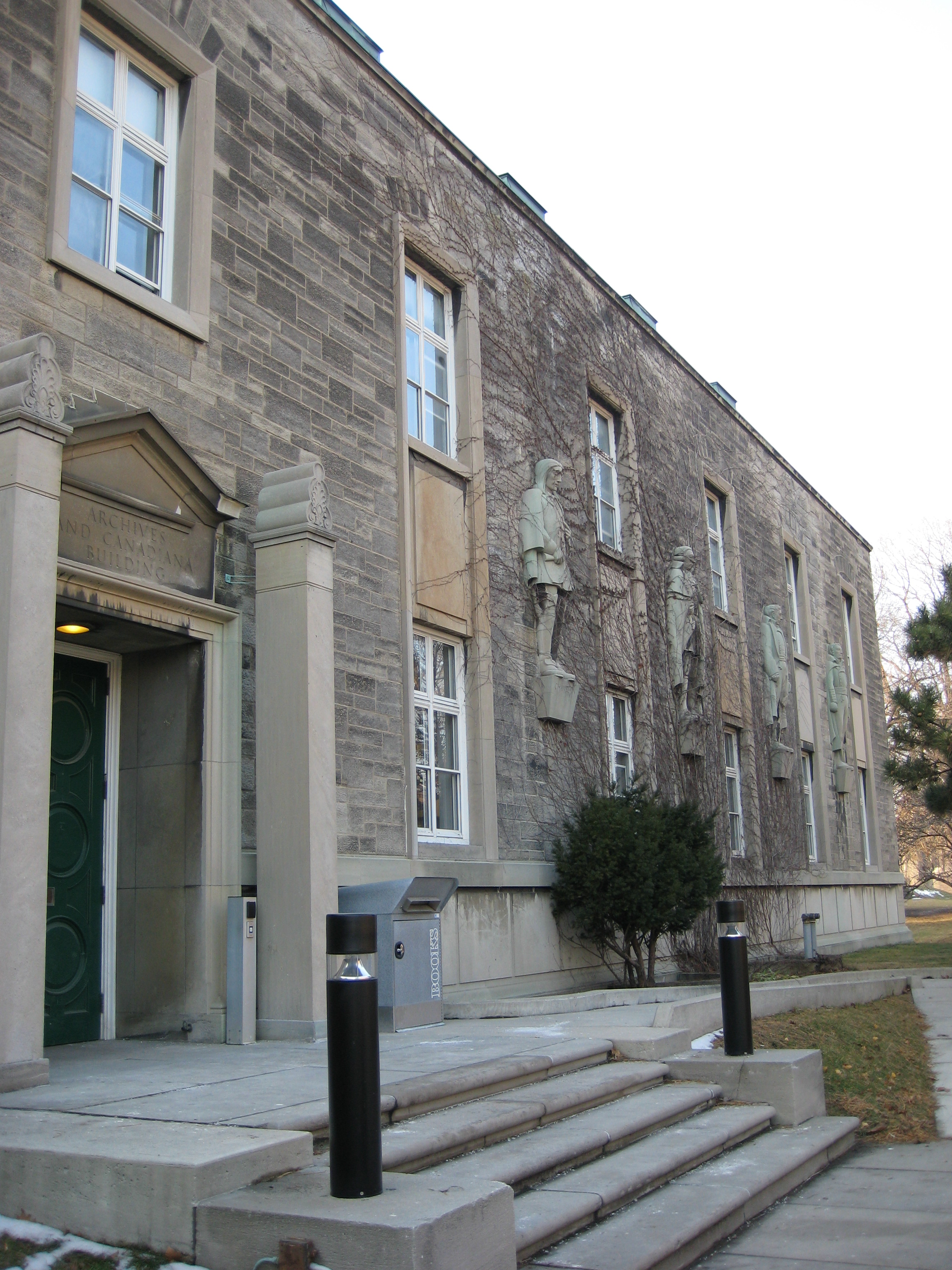
The Canadiana Gallery, home to the Master of Public Policy program

Founded in 2000 as the Munk Centre for International Studies, it was named after Canadian businessman and philanthropist Peter Munk, who made an original $6.4 million donation to finance the construction. It occupies the historic Devonshire House, a former residential hall of the university's Trinity College, and opened a second location in 2012 at 315 Bloor Street West after an $80 million collective contribution from the Peter and Melanie Munk Foundation, the Government of Canada and the Government of Ontario.

The school was criticized by students and faculty for accepting $35 million from Peter Munk in 2010 and for the terms of agreement between the school and Peter Munk. The Canadian Foreign Policy Institute stated that Peter Munk's far-right views were incompatible with the mandate of the school. Paul Hamel and John Valleau, faculty members at the University of Toronto, stated that the agreement will reduce academic independence, permit the Munk family to shape the academic work, and allow the Munk family to determine the university's priorities in place of the faculty and students. Additionally, several students and faculty criticized the decision to name the school after Munk, citing allegations of environmental damage and human rights violations by Barrick Gold in foreign countries. The mining company was founded by Munk and was the principal source of his wealth.

On April 6, 2018, the University of Toronto announced that the Munk School of Global Affairs would merge with the university's School of Public Policy and Governance to become the Munk School of Global Affairs & Public Policy. The merger took effect on July 1, 2018. The School of Public Policy and Governance was a public policy and public administration school that was founded in 2006. The Master of Public Policy program and many public policy scholars remain headquartered in the Canadiana Gallery at 14 Queen's Park Crescent West.

The Munk School offers a two-year Master of Public Policy (MPP) program, with a core curriculum emphasizing practical and applied dimensions of policymaking. The program also includes a paid internship during the summer between the first and second years. The school has internship partners that include the Canadian Federal Public Service, the Ontario Public Service, the City of Toronto, the City of Mississauga, as well as many non-governmental organizations and research think tanks. The Munk School housed the Mowat Centre for Policy Innovation – an independent, non-partisan public policy think tank – until the Centre closed in April 2019.

In spring 2024, the Munk School was labeled as an "undesirable organization" in Russia.

== Leadership ==
The founding director was Janice Stein, who held the position until 2014. The school was then headed by Stephen Toope until 2017, when he became the 346th Vice-Chancellor of the University of Cambridge. After Toope's departure, the interim director was Randall Hansen, who served as head of the School's Centre for European, Russian and Eurasian Studies.

On November 12, 2019, Michael Sabia was named as the Munk School's director, starting in February 2020. He served in that role until December 2020, when he was appointed by the Government of Canada as Deputy Minister of Finance. Professor Cheryl Misak was announced as the interim director of the Munk School, effective December 15, 2020. Peter Loewen was appointed Director in November 2021. He held the position until July 2024, when he left to join Cornell University as Dean of the College of Arts and Sciences.

In 2025, economist Mark Duggan of Stanford University was announced as the next director of the Munk School, with a term beginning on September 1, 2026.

=== Directors ===
No.	Director	Tenure	Career
1	Janice Stein	2000–2014	Political scientist
2	Stephen Toope	2014–2017	Legal scholar
3	Randall Hansen	2017–2020	Political scientist and historian
4	Michael Sabia	2020	Businessman and public servant
–	Cheryl Misak (interim)	2020–2021	
5	Peter Loewen	2021–2024	
6	Mark Duggan	2026–TBD	Economist

== Academics ==
=== Master's degrees ===
The Munk School offers three master's degrees – a Master of Global Affairs (MGA) and a Master of Public Policy (MPP), and a Master of Arts Degree in European and Eurasian Studies (CEES MA).

The Master of Global Affairs (MGA) program is a two-year interdisciplinary professional degree with curriculum covering global and financial systems, global civil society, and global strategic and security issues. The program requires students to complete a relevant internship with an NGO, an international organization such as the UN or WTO, or at an embassy or consulate abroad. Admission to the MGA is highly selective with 500 to 600 annual applicants for 80 first-year placements. After a general first year of study, students specialize in one of three areas: Global Economy and Markets, Global Civil Society, or Global Institutions. MGA students can also complete their degrees concurrently with an MBA at the Rotman School of Management or with a JD at the University of Toronto Faculty of Law. The Munk School's MGA can also be taken as one half of a dual degree with either Sciences Po, Hertie School of Governance, or the London School of Economics (LSE).

The Master of Public Policy (MPP) program is a two-year professional degree, emphasizing practical and applied dimensions of policymaking. Approximately 80 students are admitted each year. Core courses include micro and macroeconomics, legal analysis, political science and quantitative methods for policy analysis. The curriculum also includes five electives on domestic policy, law, and international policy, taken either at the Munk School or other graduate departments on the University of Toronto's St. George campus. The school frequently invites public sector leaders and external researchers to lecture and expose students to senior professionals in government and the broader public, private and community sectors. Students are required to complete an internship during the summer between the first and second year. The school internship partners include the Canadian Federal Public Service, the Ontario Public Service, the City of Toronto, the City of Mississauga, as well as many non-governmental organizations and research think tanks. Second year MPP students can compete for exchanges with partner institutions in Europe and Asia, including The Hertie School of Governance (Berlin), Sciences Po's Paris School of International Affairs (Paris), The Lee Kuan Yew School of Public Policy (Singapore), and the National Graduate Institute for Public Policy (Japan).

The Master of Arts in European and Eurasian Studies (CEES MA) is offered at the Centre for European and Eurasian Studies at the Munk School of Global Affairs & Public Policy. CEES MA is a two-year program that offers its students academic instruction paired with international professional experience. These experiences include: professional internship placements across Europe and Asia, experiential learning opportunities, a major research paper, and student led initiatives.

=== Other graduate degrees ===
The Munk School also offers joint degrees, including the Collaborative Master's/PhD Program in South Asian Studies, the Collaborative Master's Program in Asia-Pacific Studies, the Ethnic and Pluralism Studies Collaborative Graduate Program, and the Dynamics of Global Change Collaborative Doctoral Program.

=== Undergraduate degrees ===
Established as a degree program in 1985 and as a centre in 2001, the Trudeau Centre for Peace, Conflict and Justice administers the Peace, Conflict and Justice (PCJ) undergraduate programme in the Munk School of Global Affairs & Public Policy. The PCJ programme, while administered by the Munk School, is a joint initiative with the Faculty of Arts & Science. Students are required to take several Arts & Science courses to complete the programme – including in political science, economics, statistics, psychology and international relations, among others. The Centre grew out of the Peace and Conflict Studies programme established by Anatol Rapaport in the early 1980s. In 1990, Thomas Homer-Dixon assumed the Directorship and continued in that role through 2001 when the programme was institutionalized as the Trudeau Centre. Homer-Dixon's Directorship ended in 2007.

In addition to the PCJ programme, the Munk School offers several undergraduate academic programmes through the Faculty of Arts & Science. These include American Studies, Contemporary Asian Studies, European Studies, Hungarian Studies, Public Policy, South Asian Studies, as well as the Munk One Program, a first-year undergraduate seminar series. Unlike the PCJ programme, while these programmes’ courses are taught and syllabi are set by Munk School instructors, the Faculty of Arts & Science administers the programmes and sets rules for enrolment and completion.

=== Admissions ===
Admission to the two-year professional Master of Public Policy program is highly competitive. The school typically receives 600+ applications for only 80 first year spots. Candidates are selected on a holistic basis. At minimum candidates are required to have a four-year bachelor's degree, with a minimum Grade Point Average (GPA) in the final year of undergraduate studies of 3.3 out of a possible 4.0 or a B standing. However, due to the high volume of applications there are many more highly qualified candidates than first year spots and simply meeting the minimum requirements is unlikely to be sufficient to gain admission. The school assesses candidates based on 5 factors: an online application form, a statement of purpose, a resume or curriculum vitae, 2 letters of academic recommendation, and an applicant's academic record. In addition, candidates may provide up to an additional two letters of reference from another source (for example, from an employer or volunteer organization). In determining admission the school considers a strong application one that has a high level of cohesion between the 5 supporting documents and the structure and learning objectives of the MPP program.

=== Scholarships ===
The Cadario Fellowship in Public Policy is an academic and monetary award given to the top students in their second year of the program. The award was created and named after Paul Cadario, a senior manager with the World Bank in Washington and alumnus of the University of Toronto, after he donated $1 million to U of T's School of Public Policy and Governance. MPP students have also been awarded many other prestigious external scholarships and awards, including Cancer Care ON grants, Canadian Institutes of Health Research (CIHR) grants, Ontario Graduate Scholarships (OGS), and Social Sciences and Humanities Research Council (SSHRC) grants.

=== Student life ===
==== Public Policy and Governance Review ====
The Public Policy and Governance Review (PPGR) is a student-led digital magazine that showcases writing on public affairs by students, academics, and leaders in the policy world. The PPGR is a platform for bold and thoughtful analysis, and for diverse perspectives on contemporary policy debates and discussions.

The publication is funded by and housed at the University of Toronto's Munk School of Global Affairs & Public Policy. Graduate students from Munk manage its content, development, and operations.

==== Public Good Initiative ====
The Public Good Initiative (PGI) is a student-led project that pairs students from the Munk School of Global Affairs & Public Policy with community organizations that can benefit from pro bono consulting services. The PGI has worked with organizations that include United Way Toronto, Friends of the Greenbelt Foundation, Toronto City Summit Alliance, Maytree Foundation, People for Education, BC Centre for Social Enterprise, Mid Toronto Community Services, and the Ontario Association of Food Banks.

==== Beyond the Headlines ====
Beyond the Headlines (BTH) is a weekly radio show that provides fair and balanced analysis of pressing public policy issues in Canada. The one-hour program airs from 11:00 a.m. to 12:00 p.m. EST every Monday on CIUT 89.5FM, the University of Toronto’s St. George campus radio station. BTH is staffed by students (both current and alumni) who are members of the Munk School community. After its first year on the air, BTH was voted "Best New Talk Show" on CIUT 89.5FM. Since its founding in 2012, BTH has interviewed notable politicians, public servants, academics and activists, such as Josh Colle, Lynn Morrison, Mitzie Hunter, Mike Layton, Tony Dean, Daiene Vernile, Laurie Scott, Peter Singer, Garfield Dunlop, Greg Sorbara, Ron Atkey, and Michael Geist.

==== Cadario Fellowship in Public Policy ====
The Cadario Fellowship in Public Policy is an academic and monetary award given to the top students in their second year of the program. The award was created and named after Paul Cadario, a senior manager with the World Bank in Washington and alumnus of the University of Toronto, after he donated $1 million to U of T's School of Public Policy and Governance.

== Research centres, labs and initiatives ==
- Asian Institute
  - Asian Pathways Research Lab
  - Centre for South Asian Studies
  - Centre for the Study of Korea
  - Dr. David Chu Program in Asia-Pacific Studies
  - East Asia Seminar Series
  - Global Taiwan Studies Initiative
  - Southeast Asia Seminar Series
  - Tea Circle Forum
- Centre for European and Eurasian Studies
  - Petro Jacyk Program for the Study of Ukraine
  - Centre for the Study of France and the Francophone World
  - The Joint Initiative in German and European Studies
  - Eurasia Initiative
  - Global Migration Lab
- Centre for the Study of Global Japan
- Centre for the Study of the United States
- Harney Program in Ethnic, Immigration and Pluralism Studies
- Trudeau Centre for Peace, Conflict and Justice
- The Bill Graham Centre for Contemporary International History (jointly overseen by Trinity College)
- Mowat Centre for Policy Innovation (closed 2019)
- Citizen Lab
- Global Economic Policy Lab
- Global Justice Lab
- Global Migration Lab
- Innovation Policy Lab
- Policy, Elections & Representation Lab
- Urban Policy Lab
- People's History Lab
- Belt & Road in Global Perspective
- Future Skills
- Global Ideas Institute
- Local Government Revenue Initiative (LoGRI)
- Ontario 360
- Reach Alliance

=== Mowat Centre for Policy Innovation ===
The Mowat Centre for Policy Innovation was an independent, non-partisan public policy think tank housed in the Munk School. It undertook applied public policy research and engaged in public dialogue on federal issues important to the prosperity and quality of life of Ontario and Canada. The Mowat Centre had a mandate that proposed innovative, research-driven public policy recommendations that work on behalf of Canadians in all regions of the country, including Ontario. The Mowat Centre for Policy Innovation was established in 2009 with $5 million in seed funding from the Ontario Provincial government. The centre was named after Oliver Mowat, Ontario's longest-serving premier and a father of confederation.

== Faculty ==
Notable current and former faculty

- Ritu Birla, Indian historian
- Kim Campbell, Prime Minister of Canada
- Mel Cappe, Clerk of the Privy Council
- Ian D. Clark, President, Council of Ontario Universities
- Joe Clark, Prime Minister of Canada
- Tony Dean, Canadian senator
- Shuman Ghosemajumder, Chairman, TeachAids
- Joseph Heath, philosopher
- Michael Ignatieff, Leader of the Liberal Party of Canada
- Michèle Lamont, sociologist
- Amanda Lang, journalist
- Peter Mansbridge, journalist
- Dalton McGuinty, Premier of Ontario
- Bill Morneau, Canadian Minister of Finance
- Bob Rae, Premier of Ontario
- Michael Sabia, CEO, BCE
- Timothy Snyder, Historian
- John Stackhouse, Editor-in-Chief, The Globe & Mail
- Janice Stein, founder of Munk School
- Michael Tulloch, Chief Justice of Ontario
- Paul Wells, journalist
- Kathleen Wynne, Premier of Ontario

== See also ==
- List of academic units of the University of Toronto
- Public policy school
- Master of Public Policy
- Mowat Centre for Policy Innovation
