= Elicia Maine =

Canadian innovation academic

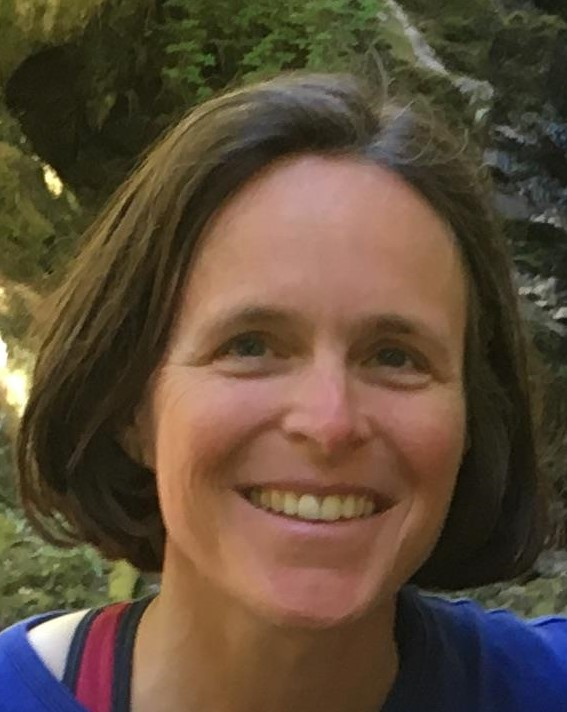
- Maine in 2017
- Born: Canada
- Education: Queen's University at Kingston (BSc); Queen's University at Kingston (BA); Massachusetts Institute of Technology (MS); University of Cambridge (PhD)
- Occupation: Professor

Elicia Maine is a Canadian academic. She was the founding educational coordinator for New Ventures BC, and the founding Academic Director of Invention to Innovation (i2I), an award-winning graduate program in science & technology commercialization offered in traditional and online formats. Within Simon Fraser University's Beedie School of Business, she serves as Associate Vice President, Knowledge Mobilization & Innovation, providing oversight of SFU Innovates.

Maine serves on the Board of Directors for the Foresight Cleantech Accelerator and Innovate BC., on the Princeton University Dean for Research Innovation & Entrepreneurship Council and on the Mitacs Research Council.

Her research interests include science innovation, science & technology entrepreneurship, technology-market matching, and innovation policy. Maine was honoured with the 2022 Trailblazer Award in Innovation Policy by the Canadian Science Policy Centre.

She is the head of a Simon Fraser University Beedie School of Business project to help students convert research findings into tangible products that just recently received $22.9M from the Natural Sciences and Engineering Research Council of Canada’s Lab to Market program.

== Awards ==
- Person of the Year Nomination, BC Tech Association, 2016
- TD Canada Trust Distinguished Teaching Award, Beedie School of Business, 2017
- B.C.'s Most Influential Women 2018: Stem Stars, BC Business
- Top Educator Award, BC Cleantech Awards, 2021
- Trailblazer Award, Innovation Policy, Canadian Science Policy Conference, 2022

== Selected publications ==
- Park, A., Goudarzi, A., Yaghmaie, P., Thomas, V. J., & Maine, E. (2022). Rapid response through the entrepreneurial capabilities of academic scientists. Nature Nanotechnology, 17(8), 802-807. https://doi.org/10.1038/s41565-022-01103-6
- Maine, E., & Garnsey, E. (2006). Commercializing generic technology: The case of advanced materials ventures. Research Policy, 35(3), 375-393. https://doi.org/10.1016/j.respol.2005.12.006
- Maine, E., Soh, P. H., & Dos Santos, N. (2015). The role of entrepreneurial decision-making in opportunity creation and recognition. Technovation, 39, 53-72. https://doi.org/10.1016/j.technovation.2014.02.007
