= American Parliamentary Debate Association =

Intercollegiate debating association

- Formation: 1981
- Type: Student debating organization
- Region served: United States
- Affiliations: World Universities Debating Council
- Website: www.apda.online www.apdaweb.org (formerly)

The American Parliamentary Debate Association (APDA) is the oldest intercollegiate parliamentary debating association in the United States. APDA sponsors over 50 tournaments a year, all in a parliamentary format, as well as a national championship in late April. It also administers the North American Debating Championship with the Canadian University Society for Intercollegiate Debate (CUSID) every year in January. Although it is mainly funded by its member universities, APDA is an entirely student-run organization.

== Organizational structure ==
APDA comprises about 80 universities, mainly in the Northeastern United States, ranging as far north as Maine and as far south as North Carolina. APDA includes both private and public colleges and universities.

APDA members stage weekly debating tournaments, each at a different university and occurring throughout the academic year. Most weekends have two or three debating tournaments: at least one will be north of New York City and south of New York City, in order to shorten transport time. However, centrally located tournaments or historically large tournaments, such as Princeton, Rutgers, and Harvard, will be “unopposed”, meaning that they will be the only tournament on that particular weekend. Individual schools must ensure that their tournaments meet a broad set of APDA guidelines, but are free to tinker with their tournament formats.

There are a number of tournaments in which APDA plays a direct role. Most prominently, APDA sponsors a national championship at the end of each year. Unlike all other tournaments, debating at Nationals is limited to one team per university, plus any additional teams who “qualified” for Nationals during that debate season. There are several ways to qualify for Nationals: The most common through the 2006–2007 season was to reach the final round of a tournament. Starting with the 2007–2008 season, qualification was earned through year-long performance, gauged by how far debaters advance at tournaments of varying sizes.

In addition, APDA sponsors a novice tournament at the beginning of the season, a pro-am tournament once per semester, and the North American Debating Championships, which are held every other year in the United States and include top teams from the United States and Canada.

APDA also has a ranking system which combines the results of all of the year's tournaments. Both individual speakers and two-member teams can earn points based on the results of the tournament; these points also scale up depending on the tournament's size. At the end of the debate season, APDA gives awards to the top ten teams, speakers, and novices of the year.

APDA is an entirely student-run organization. The APDA board members are students from various host institutions, and most of the tournaments are completely organized by the host school's debate team. Some teams do have professional coaches, but these are usually recently retired debaters who wish to stay involved with the circuit.

== Tournaments ==
Weekly debating tournaments are the core of APDA. While numerous schools slightly alter the tournament format, the general format is fairly constant. Tournaments usually start on Friday afternoon and end on Saturday evening. Five preliminary rounds are held, three on Friday and two on Saturday. The first round is randomly paired, while remaining rounds are bracketed, meaning that teams with the same record face each other. Preliminary rounds generally have only one judge, most frequently a debater from the host school. After five rounds, the “break” is announced, consisting of the top eight teams at the tournament. These teams compete in single-elimination quarterfinals, semifinals, and finals, judged by progressively larger panels of judges, and a tournament winner is crowned. Separate semifinals and then finals are held on the basis of the previous five rounds for the top novice team. Trophies are awarded to the top speakers, top teams, and top novice (first-year) debaters. Certain tournaments tinker with the format, having more or fewer preliminary rounds and larger or smaller breaks; the national championships, for instance, generally have one additional preliminary round and one additional elimination round.

== Format ==
Debates at APDA tournaments follow a debating style known as American Parliamentary Debate, which is modeled loosely on the procedure and decorum of the UK Parliament. This style emphasizes argumentation and rhetoric, rather than research and detailed factual knowledge.

=== Flow of the round ===
A round of debate features two teams of two debaters each: the Government team, including the Prime Minister and the Member of Government, and the Opposition team, including the Leader of the Opposition and the Member of the Opposition.

Six speeches in all are delivered, varying in length:

- Prime Minister's Constructive: 7 minutes, 30 seconds
- Leader of the Opposition's Constructive: 8 minutes, 30 seconds
- Member of Government: 8 minutes, 30 seconds
- Member of the Opposition: 8 minutes, 30 seconds
- Leader of the Opposition's Rebuttal: 4 minutes, 30 seconds
- Prime Minister's Rebuttal: 5 minutes, 30 seconds

=== Points of information ===
A debater may rise to ask a point of information (POI) of an opponent during the opponent's speech. POIs are only permitted during the first four speeches, though prohibited in the first and final minutes of each speech. The speaking debater can choose to hear the POI or to dismiss it politely. Traditionally when standing on a point of information some debaters extend one hand palm up, holding the back of the head with the other. This pose originated in old British Parliamentary etiquette: an MP would adopt the position to secure his wig and show that he was not carrying a weapon. It is generally considered good form to accept at least one POI during a speech.

=== Resolutions ===
In most rounds, there is no resolution, and the Government team may propose whatever case it wishes consistent with the standards below. Certain tournaments provide both teams with a motion to which the case must conform 15 minutes before the round starts.

Since the Opposition team arrives at the round with no prior knowledge of the case, some kinds of resolutions are not permitted to ensure a fair debate. If Opposition feels that the round fits any one of these categories, they may point this out during the Leader's speech. If the judge agrees, Opposition wins. There are five kinds of disallowed resolutions:

- tight resolutions, which are deemed too one-sided (“racism is bad”, for example);
- truisms (“Joe Biden was the greatest Democratic president of the U.S. since Barack Obama”);
- tautologies (“Good citizens should help the poor,” with goodness defined as "a willingness to do charitable acts");
- status quo resolutions (“The United States should have jury trials”);
- specific-knowledge cases, i.e., cases which are unfair toward the Opposition team because they require highly obscure knowledge to oppose effectively ("NASA should replace the current sealant used on the space shuttle with hypoxynucleotide-C4598")

Aside from these five limitations, virtually any topic for debate is fair game, as long as there are two coherent and debatable sides. Debaters may also present opp-choice cases, in which the government team offers the opposition team the chance to choose which side of a topic the government team will defend in the round.

=== Adjudication ===
A judge listens to the round and provides quantitative and qualitative assessments of the round as a whole and of the individual speakers. Some rounds use a panel of judges. Judges are usually debaters themselves, but non-debater judges, or lay judges, are sometimes used.

=== Comparison to other styles ===
The APDA style is generally seen as occupying a middle ground between the styles of CUSID and NPDA. It is somewhat more rule-oriented and structured than the CUSID style, as point-by-point argumentation and careful structure are considered very important. It also emphasizes detailed analysis and de-emphasizes oratory as compared to CUSID. However, APDA style is less structured and theoretical than the NPDA style, and demands less use of technical debate formalisms.

== Types of cases ==
APDA's format allows for an enormous variety of cases. This list is not comprehensive, but should be treated as a general sketch of the case climate.

=== Public policy ===
Cases about public policy are among the most common cases on APDA. They include common public policy debates (school vouchers, term limits, euthanasia, capital punishment, race-based affirmative action) as well as more unconventional ideas (mandatory organ donation, proxy voting for children, private criminal prosecution, and innumerable others). Libertarian policy proposals, such as abolishing the minimum wage or abolishing paternalistic laws, are particularly popular. Cases involving the policies of particular organizations are popular as well, such as debates surrounding university speech codes. Additionally, broad social questions can be discussed without centering the case around a government actor; “Are trade unions, all things considered, a good thing for society?” is a perfectly acceptable opp-choice debate case.

=== Political theory ===
Abstract questions about political philosophy are also popular topics of debate. Cases about the relative benefits of the Rawlsian “veil of ignorance” versus the Hobbesian “state of nature”, for instance, are commonplace. These rounds will generally be folded into moral hypotheticals; for instance, rather than a team actually proposing that the veil of ignorance is a worthwhile political theory, a team might argue that economic human rights should be included in constitutions, and use the veil of ignorance as a justification.

=== Law and legal theory ===
All aspects of law are fair game on APDA, including constitutional law (e.g. whether a Supreme Court case was wrongly decided), procedural law (e.g. whether standards of proof should differ for criminal and civil law) and abstract legal theory (e.g. whether retributive justice is a moral justification for the criminal justice system).

=== Foreign policy ===
Many aspects of American and international foreign policy make for excellent debate rounds. Various aspects of policy related to Iraq, Israel, North Korea, and Cuba are frequent debate topics.

=== Moral hypotheticals ===
Hypothetical moral dilemmas are popular topics for debate, given that they can be discussed with a minimum of specific knowledge and a maximum of argumentation. They can range from completely fantastical situations (“If you had definitive proof that one particular religion was the true religion, should you reveal it to society?”) to unlikely occurrences (“Should you kill one person to save five other people?”) to dilemmas we face every day (“You see a homeless person on the street, should you give him money you have in your pocket?”) The infinite number of hypothetical situations that can give rise to moral dilemmas make many moral hypothetical cases unique.

=== Abstract philosophy ===
Although somewhat less common than tangible moral hypotheticals, all aspects of philosophy make their way into debate rounds. Ethics is probably the most debated field of philosophy, including both abstract metaethics and modern ethical problems like the trolley problem. However, philosophy of religion (“Is it rational to be an atheist?”), philosophy of mind (“Can a computer have mental states?”) and even philosophy of language (“Does love result from appreciation of someone’s properties, or does appreciation of someone’s properties result from love?”) can result in excellent rounds.

=== Time-space ===
One type of case, common on APDA but rare on other circuits, is the time-space case. This places the speaker in the position of some real-life, fictional, or historical figure. Only information accessible to a person in that position is legal in this type of round. For instance, “You are Socrates. Don’t commit suicide” could not reference events that took place after Socrates’ death. The speaker can be a fictional character (“You are Homer Simpson. Do not sell your soul”), a historical character (“You are Abraham Lincoln. Do not sign the emancipation proclamation”) or virtually any other sentient individual.

One notable type of time-space case is the historical hypothetical case, in which decisions made by particular historical figures are debated from their historical context. Debates surrounding, for instance, Civil War strategy or World War I alliances are commonplace. These types of debates often require a detailed knowledge of history.

Time-space cases are a particularly sensitive type of case for the government, because their setting must leave room for the opposition to defeat the case even if that would go against the historical outcome already known to everyone in the room.

== History ==
While parliamentary debate had been popular in America for some time, there was no proper organization that existed to schedule tournaments, officiate a national championship or resolve disputes. The result was a bizarrely ordered chaos. Following the Glasgow World Championship in 1981, APDA was founded. It has dramatically grown in size since then. It became an incorporated organization in 2000.

=== Presidents ===
The President is the leader of the Executive Board of APDA, presiding over the Vice President of Operations, Vice President of Finance, and three Members-at-Large. They also serve as the American representative for WUDC. Candidates from various member schools typically declare in the middle of February. Elections are typically held on the final weekend of March annually to elect the Executive Board for the following academic year.

=== Bo Missonis Award ===
This award is given to rising fourth-year debaters who, in the opinion of its prior recipient(s), best represent(s) Bo Missonis. This symbolizes a zest for debate for its own sake accompanied by a certain individuality or style, and in promoting a kind environment for the league. It is awarded to rising seniors so that it may be awarded each year. It is named after Robert "Bo" Missonis.

=== Chris Porcaro Award ===
This award is given to the fourth-year debater with the most top speaker finishes in their APDA career. It is named after Chris Porcaro, the 1998 APDA speaker of the year, who died of cancer in 2000.

=== APDA Speakers of the Year ===
The APDA Speaker of the Year award is presented to the top-ranked individual speaker over the course of the academic year.

=== Jeff Williams Award ===
Created in 2007, the Jeff Williams award is presented to the fourth-year debater who, in the course of their APDA career, has earned the most finishes in the top ten of any OTY category.

=== Kyle Bean Award ===
Created in 2016, the Kyle Bean award is presented to the debater or debaters who best embodies the qualities of Kyle Bean, a former Harvard debater who died earlier that season. Those qualities included being welcoming to new debaters, using debate to explore interesting topics, and enjoying debate in a way that makes the activity more fun for everyone else. The award is agnostic to the competitive success of the debater, and instead acknowledges individuals for positive personal contributions to the debate community.

=== Distinguished Service Award ===
The Distinguished Service Award (DSA) is awarded in order to recognize and honor individuals who have delivered outstanding contributions to APDA, parliamentary debate, or the facilitation of public discourse. These contributions may be of any nature, but must be characterized by devotion to APDA and/or its ideals above and beyond that expected of an individual in the position of the honoree.

=== Member organizations ===
- American University Debate Society
- Amherst Debate Society
- Bates Brooks-Quimby Debate Council
- Boston University Debate Society
- Brandeis University Mock Trial Association (BUMTA)
- Brown Debating Union
- Bryn Mawr Parliamentary Debate Society
- Columbia Debate Society
- Cornell Debate Association
- City University of New York Debate Society
- Dartmouth College Parliamentary Debate Team
- Duke Debate
- Fordham Debate Society
- Franklin and Marshall Debate Club
- Georgetown Parliamentary Debate Team
- George Washington Parliamentary Debate Society
- Hamilton College
- Harvard Speech and Parliamentary Debate Society
- Haverford College Debate Team
- Johns Hopkins Undergraduate Debate Council
- Loyola Marymount
- Massachusetts Institute of Technology Debate Team
- Middlebury Debate Society
- Moody Bible Institute Debate Society
- Mount Holyoke College Debate Society
- NYU Parliamentary Debate Union
- Northeastern Debate Society
- Odette Debate Team
- Penn Debate Society
- Princeton Debate Panel
- Providence College Debate Society
- Rutgers University Debate Union
- Smith College Debate Society
- Stanford Debate Society
- Swarthmore College Amos J. Peaslee Debate Society
- Temple University Debate Society
- The College of New Jersey Society for Parliamentary Debate
- Tufts University Debate Society
- University of Chicago Chicago Debate Society
- University of Maryland, College Park Parliamentary Debate Society
- University of Massachusetts Debate Society
- University of Pittsburgh Parliamentary Debate Organization
- University of Virginia
- Villanova Debate Union
- Wellesley College Speech and Debate Society
- Wesleyan University Debate Association
- West Point
- William & Mary Debate Society
- Williams Debate Team
- Yale Debate Association
- In addition to others not listed

== Results and Awards ==
Team of the Year
Year	Team Members	Instituition
2026	Naz Soysal & Zander Jeinthanuttkanont	Yale University
2025	Alessandro Perri & Roy Tiefer	University of Chicago
2024	Ahmad Howard & Roy Tiefer	University of Chicago
2023	Ahmad Howard & Alessandro Perri	University of Chicago
2022	Devesh Kodnani & Robert Brown	University of Chicago
2021	Jacob Boehm & Zan Rozen	Amherst College
2020	Aditya Dhar & Paloma O'Connor	Harvard University

Speaker of the Year
Year	Speaker	Institution
2026	Naz Soysal	Yale University
2025	Alessandro Perri	University of Chicago
2024	Ryan Lafferty	Dartmouth College
2023	Roy Tiefer	University of Chicago
2022	John Youssef	Tufts University
2021	Ellie Singer	Yale University
2020	Sandy Greenberg	Brown University

== Notable alumni ==
- David Frum, Yale Debate Association '82, Conservative commentator and speechwriter to President George W. Bush
- Chris Coons, Amherst Debate Society '85, United States Senator
- David Foster Wallace, Amherst '85, Writer and MacArthur Fellow
- Michael C. Dorf, Harvard '86, American law professor and constitutional law scholar
- Yoram Hazony, Princeton Debate Society '86
- Sherry Kolb, Columbia '86, American legal scholar
- Tamar Gendler, Yale '87, Dean of the Faculty of Arts and Sciences, Yale University
- Kris Kobach, Harvard '87, Secretary of State, Kansas
- Paul Clement, Georgetown '88, Solicitor General of the United States under President George W. Bush, defended the Defense of Marriage Act and opposed the Patient Protection and Affordable Care Act
- Austan Goolsbee, Yale Debate Association '91, Professor of Economics, University of Chicago and member of President Obama's Council of Economic Advisers
- Ted Cruz, Princeton Debate Panel '92, United States Senator

== See also ==
- Competitive debate in the United States
