= History of Baltimore City College =

Historical events of Baltimore City College

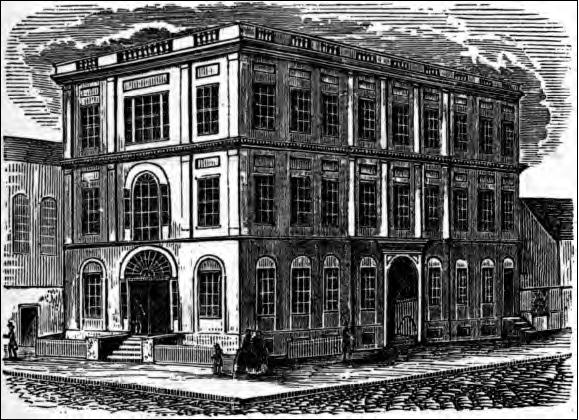
The old "Assembly Rooms" of the former Baltimore Dancing Assembly, built 1797, third floor added 1835. First major school-owned structure of "The High School" (founded 1839), purchased 1843, later called the "Male High School" briefly after 1844, renamed the "Central High School of Baltimore", (later becoming The Baltimore City College in 1866). The building located at the northeast corner of Holliday and East Fayette Streets, burned in November 1873, in a fire that spread from the adjacent famous Holliday Street Theater. It is now the site of the War Memorial Plaza (constructed 1917–1925) between the later Baltimore City Hall of 1867–75, to the west and the War Memorial Hall of 1925, to the east

The history of The Baltimore City College began in March 1839, when the City Council of Baltimore, Maryland, passed a resolution mandating the creation of a male high school with a focus on the study of English and classical literature. "The High School" (later becoming The Baltimore City College) was opened later in the same year on October 20, with 46 pupils under the direction of Professor Nathan C. Brooks,(1809-1898), a local noted classical educator and poet, who became the first principal of a new type of higher institution in the developing public education system in the city begun in 1829. It is now considered to be the third oldest public high school / secondary school in the nation. In 1850, the Baltimore City Council granted the school, then known as the "Central High School of Baltimore", the authority to present its graduates with certificates of completion. An effort to expand that academic power and allow the then named "Central High School of Baltimore" to confer Bachelor of Arts degrees began following the Civil War in 1865, and continued the following year with the renaming of the institution as "The Baltimore City College", which it still holds to this day, with also the retitling of its chief academic officer from "principal" to "president", along with an increase in the number of years of its course of study and the expansion of its courses. However, despite this early elevation effort, it ended at that brief period unsuccessfully in 1869, although the B.C.C. continued for a number of years as a hybrid public high school and early form of junior college (later known as community college) which did not fully appear in America in different form until the beginning of the 20th century. Very often the elaborate decorative fancy engraved graduation diploma from the B.C.C. in the late 19th and early 20th centuries was accepted by many other colleges and universities entitling City graduates to enter upper-division schools at the sophomore year, (which was also coincidentally a privilege also accorded to its later local academic and athletic rival for 127 years - "Poly", the Baltimore Polytechnic Institute, founded 1883 as the Baltimore Manual Training School, later renamed 1893).

As the importance of higher education increased in the early 20th century, the High School's priorities shifted to preparing students for college. In 1927, only one year before the school moved from its home at Howard and Centre Streets for 53 years to the magnificent stone "Castle on the Hill" on "Collegian Hill", the academic program was further changed, when the City College divided its curriculum into two tracks: the standard college preparatory program, or "'B' Course", and a more rigorous stiff "Advanced College Prep" curriculum, the famed "'A' Course" of study focusing on humanities, social studies, liberal arts and the Classics. (also available in the mathematics/science/technology fields in a more structured form with little options/electives at "Poly" and at Western and Eastern High Schools for girls).

The school underwent major demographic changes following the U.S. Supreme Court's unanimous ruling in the May 1954 decision "Brown vs. Board of Education of Topeka, Kansas" case that called for an end to racial segregation. African Americans joined City College for the first time at the end of that summer, in September 1954 and became a significant proportion of the student population by the 1960s, with over half black by 1966, reflecting similar trends in the city itself. Mr. Pierre H. Davis, also later became the first "Negro"/"Colored" teacher to join the B.C.C. faculty the following year of 1955 for only one year in the Business Education Department, along with Eugene Parker in the Physical Education Department, who went on becoming head basketball coach for three decades. Mr. Davis, coincidentally returned 15 years later to become the first Afro-American principal of the City College in September 1970. The school saw further changes in the student population with the admission of women in 1978.

Academic standards and enrollment numbers at the Baltimore City College (B.C.C.) after reaching a high of near 4,000 boys by the mid-1960s went through a period of decline first in the late 1960s to mid 1970s, with the rapid opening of newer additional high schools both in the outreaches of the city along with the rapidly expanding suburbs in surrounding Baltimore County. Two in the city system were Northwestern in 1965 and Northern in the following year. Three high schools were completed and opened all at one time in September 1971, with Southwestern, Walbrook and a massive huge complex nearby to City in Clifton Park on the bed of the old reservoir off Harford Road, Lake Clifton. The 'A' and 'B' courses were slowly dying out and unfortunately discontinued by 1973, and a single academic track was offered.

After another period of neglect in the late 1980s after the decade long stimulating and long leadership of the "New City College" program, curriculum and admissions standards under Principal Solomon Lausch, by the early 1990s, to the mid-1990s, with an increase in funding from the BCPS school system, and the selection of the high school to be one of the few to sub-contract out its maintenance and support functions to the Educational Alternatives, Inc. private system (E.A.I.) who were already academically operating and running several other city elementary and middle schools under an experimental but controversial contract with the BCPS and the school board. The B.C.C. began to experience a turnaround under new principal and former attorney, Dr. Joseph Wilson brought in during 1994 after a nationwide job search. Administrators re-strengthened academic standards and, in 1998, the school began offering the International Baccalaureate (IB) Diploma Program. By the beginning of the decade of the 2000s, City College was experiencing an academic resurgence. During this period the school was recognized by the U.S. Department of Education as a National Blue Ribbon School, was listed as one of the top high schools in the United States by Newsweek magazine.

== Early years ==
The creation of a male high school "in which the higher branches of English and classical literature should be taught exclusively" was authorized unanimously by the Baltimore City Council on March 7, 1839. A townhouse of probably two stories with a sloped roof and dormer window structure on what was then known as Courtland Street (now east side of "Preston Gardens", built in the late 1910s with terraced and bermed flower beds with shrubs and monumental staircases along St. Paul Street and St. Paul Place, of five square blocks between East Centre Street in the north and East Lexington Street to the south, as Baltimore's first downtown "urban renewal" project, which unfortunately resulted in the razing of hundreds of beautiful, but run-down, then neglected Federal, Georgian, and Greek Revival architecture-styled townhomes and classical business structures that would be considered to be saved under the "historic preservation" standards today) was acquired to serve as the home of the new high school. The school opened its doors that Fall on October 20, 1839 with 46 students. Enrollment was restricted to white, male students of Baltimore City who had completed grammar school and passed an entrance exam. Additional student applicants from the surrounding rural (and later suburban) Baltimore County and Anne Arundel County were considered upon payment of tuition to the Baltimore City Public Schools system Those enrolled were offered two academic tracks, a classical literature track and an English literature track. The sole instructor for both tracks was the educator and poet, Nathan C. Brooks, who also served as principal. To accommodate the two tracks, Brooks split the school day into two sections: one in the morning from 9 am to 12 am, and another in the afternoon from 2 pm to 5 pm. During the morning session, students studied either classics or English; however, the afternoon was devoted to English.

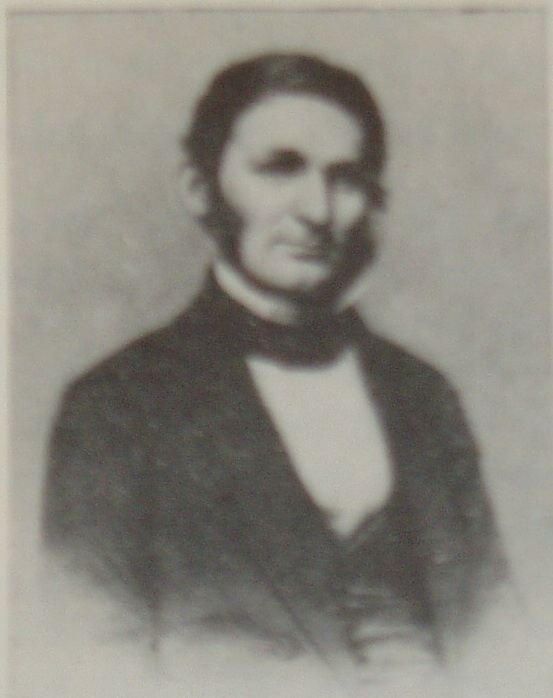
Prof. Nathan C. Brooks, (1809-1898), first founding principal of "The High School", later after 1844 known as "The Male High School" (now "The Baltimore City College"

In its first three years, the school was housed in many locations before returning to the original townhouse building on Courtland Street. In 1843, the City Council allocated $23,000 to acquire a building for the school at the northeastern corner of East Fayette and Holliday Streets, (across the street from the later Baltimore City Hall, constructed 1867–1875), and the site of the present War Memorial Plaza, constructed 1917–1925). The renovated new school building was the former old "Assembly Rooms", a Greek Revival architecture civic landmark, built in 1797 by architects Robert Cary Long, Sr. and Col. Nicholas Rogers (ancestor owner of the estate which became Druid Hill Park) to accommodate social events for Baltimore's social elite at the Baltimore Dancing Assembly, which had begun in the 1780s. and the site of the first private library company of Baltimore. The school was next door to the famous Holliday Street Theatre, where the poem "The Defence of Fort McHenry", now known as the "Star Spangled Banner" written by Frederick and Georgetown lawyer and amateur poet, Francis Scott Key, (1779-1843), was first performed on its stage in October and November 1814, following the Battle of Baltimore, with the British Royal Navy and Army attack on Baltimore during the War of 1812, (now known as "Defenders' Day") on September 12-13-14, 1814. Although it was not designed to house an academic institution, the school would occupy this building for 30 years.

The male high school for Baltimore went through the first of a series of name changes in 1844. First known and founded in 1839 as "The High School", it was renamed the "Male High School" because of the establishment of two schools for females — Eastern and Western High Schools, which opened in November of that year.

In 1849, after a decade of service, Prof. Brooks resigned as principal of the school, which had now grown to include 232 students and 7 teachers, excluding Brooks. Rev. Dr. Francis G. Waters, who had been the president of the Washington College, on the Eastern Shore of Maryland in Chestertown, succeeded Brooks. The following year the city council renamed the school "The Central High School of Baltimore" and granted the commissioners of the public schools the right to confer certificates to the high school's graduates. Exercising that new authority, the new C.H.S. of B. held its first commencement ceremony in 1851 with noted local philosopher, author and civic leader Severn Teackle Wallis, (1816-1894), as the guest speaker, (Wallis has a bronze statue to his memory and many city accomplishments at the eastern end from the Washington Monument of Mount Vernon Place/East Monument Street facing the intersection with St. Paul Street. This bolstered enrollment in the school, as students were drawn by the prospect of receiving a certificate attesting to their level of education. That year 156 students applied to the school—an increase of 50 students.

The growing enrollment necessitated a reorganization of the school. Under the direction of Waters, the school day was divided into eight periods lasting forty-five minutes: four sessions were held in the morning and four in the afternoon. In addition to reorganizing the schedule, he divided the courses into seven different departments: Belles-letters and history, mathematics, natural sciences, moral, mental, and political science, ancient languages, modern languages and music. Each of the seven instructors was assigned to a distinct department and received the title of "professor".

== Baltimore City College ==
Name Changes
March 7, 1839:	The High School
1844:	Male High School
1850:	The Central High School
October 9, 1866:	The Baltimore City College (BCC)

In 1865, in accordance with a recommendation from the board of commissioners of the Baltimore City public schools, City College began offering a five-year track, beginning a process aimed at elevating the school to a college and allowing it to grant its graduates degrees. To further these aims, the school was renamed "The Baltimore City College" (BCC) by an act of the city council on October 9, 1866. That same year, the board of commissioners recommended that the city council make a formal proposal to the Maryland General Assembly to grant City College the authority to confer Bachelor of Arts degrees to its graduates. According to the 38th Annual Report of the Board of Commissioners of the Public Schools to the Mayor and City Council, the elevation of the school was designed to "afford advantages to students...who may adopt the profession of teacher as a pursuit of life." Thus, the elevation was intended to provide qualified teachers for the Baltimore school system. However, the city council never acted on this recommendation and though the school changed nominally, it was never truly granted the power of a college. Not only did the city council fail to make the recommendation to the general assembly, but it also failed to adequately maintain the facilities of the school. In the 43rd Annual Report of the Board of Commissioners of the Public Schools to the Mayor and City Council, the president of the board wrote:

The subject of chronic lamentation,—the Baltimore City College Building,—which for the past fifteen years has afforded annually such abundant matter for melancholy regrets, not withstanding all the fervent promises and eloquent professions of interest that have been made from time to time extended, still remains as a crumbling monument of our withered hopes and blasted expectations.

In addition, the president of the board again requested that the city council attempt to elevate the status of City College, "so that it shall be placed on equal footing in all respects to that of a first class collegiate institution," but no action was taken. Since there was no incentive to pursue the five-year track, no student remained at the school for the extra year of study and the course was abandoned in 1869.

== Relocation ==
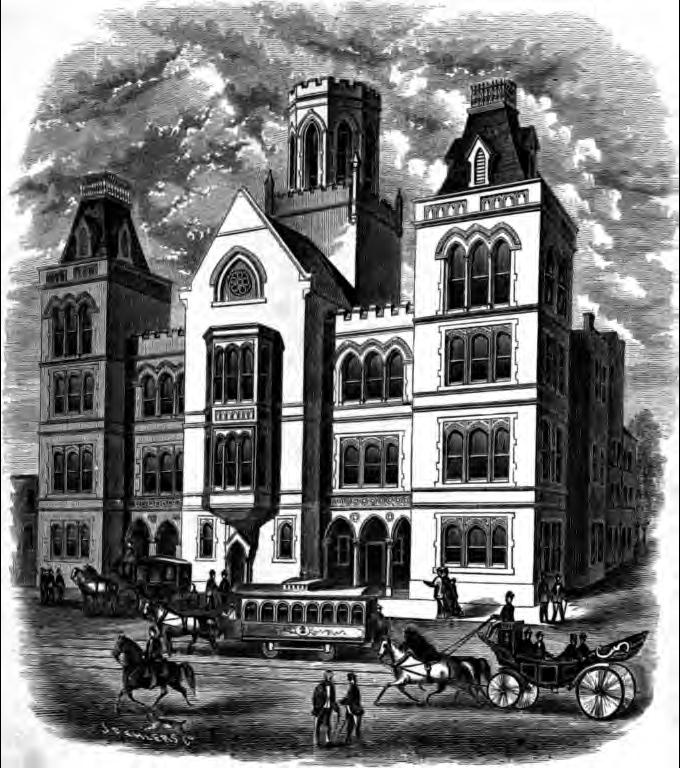
Rendering of the Baltimore City College building on Howard Street opposite Centre Street. Completed in 1875, it was designed by Baltimore City Hall architect, George A. Frederick.

It was not until 1873, when a fire spread from the Holliday Street Theatre to the "Assembly Rooms," that the city council finally decided to expend the resources to erect a new building for the school. The city council acquired a lot on Howard Street opposite Centre Street and allocated $150,000 for the construction of the new building. During the construction, City College was housed in a building of the Baltimore Female College, where it remained until its new English Gothic revival-style building was dedicated on February 1, 1875. While at the Baltimore Female College, the five-year course was reintroduced and the four-year track was eliminated. That allowed students to pursue advanced courses, which included calculus, political economy, logic and higher-level language courses, which were emphasized in the curriculum. Students were expected to learn Latin, French, and German; and Greek was offered as an optional course.

In 1876, ceremonies were held in the adjacent Academy of Music for the new Johns Hopkins University, which had established several buildings alongside City College under its first president, Daniel Coit Gilman. Four graduates of City College entered Hopkins as a part of the first undergraduate class. That same year BCC's academic program underwent further changes with the introduction of a one-year track, which provided an opportunity for students who could not complete the entire course of study because they needed to enter the labor market. Courses in the one-year track focused on providing students with pragmatic skills, such as "book-keeping", "commercial arithmetic", and "business correspondence".

City College's first extracurricular activity, the Bancroft Literary Association, was established the same year to provide a forum for student debate. A second debating society, the Carrollton Society, was established in 1878. One of the first athletic teams appeared the following year, when a group of students organized a lacrosse team—the first at a public high school. The establishment of Baltimore Polytechnic Institute (Poly) in 1883 was an important development for City College's athletics program. With the founding of Poly, City College acquired an arch rival in academics and sports—particularly football. The schools have met annually in a football clash since 1889. The formal organization of an athletic program at BCC did not begin until 1895. During the early years of the athletic program, City College played chiefly against college teams because few other secondary schools existed in Maryland. City College's 1895 football schedule included St. John's College, Swarthmore College, the United States Naval Academy, University of Maryland, and Washington College.

== Reconstruction ==
City College's Tudor and Gothic-style building, designed by Baltimore City Hall architect George A Frederick, lasted until 1892, when it was undermined by the construction of the Baltimore & Ohio Railroad tunnel from Camden Station to Mount Royal Station, and collapsed. Several years of political in-fighting and the change to a reformist city administration delayed construction of a new structure. Designed by the architects Baldwin and Pennington, the new structure was not completed until 1899.

The succeeding year, the only time since 1851, the school did not hold a commencement. Members of the senior class had decided to make fun of the professors in the Green Bag—City College's year book since 1896. When the school board was alerted of the matter, it attempted to censor the edition, passing a resolution requiring the Green Bag to be reviewed by Principal Francis A. Soper. However, the year book had already been printed, and the editors refused to have the edition censored and reprinted. The school board responded by withholding the diplomas of six of the editors of the Green Bag and the business manager, and by preventing the school from holding a commencement ceremony. One of the boys expelled, Clarence Keating Bowie, became a member of the school board in 1926.

In 1901, the course of study at City College went through a series of further changes. The most significant was the reduction of the five-year course of study to four years; though students who entered prior to 1900 were allowed to complete the five-year course. The new course, like the course it replaced, allowed graduates to be admitted to Johns Hopkins University without examination, and provided students with greater flexibility. Instead of requiring students to complete the same set of courses, it allowed students to choose their courses, as long as they completed 150 credits.

The program's explicit purpose was to provide special preparation for those wishing to attend college because of the increasing significance of college education. Though specific classes were not required, to meet the goal, students were required to complete courses in English literature and composition, four foreign languages, mathematics, science, history, commerce, drawing, music, and physical culture.

== "Castle on the Hill" ==
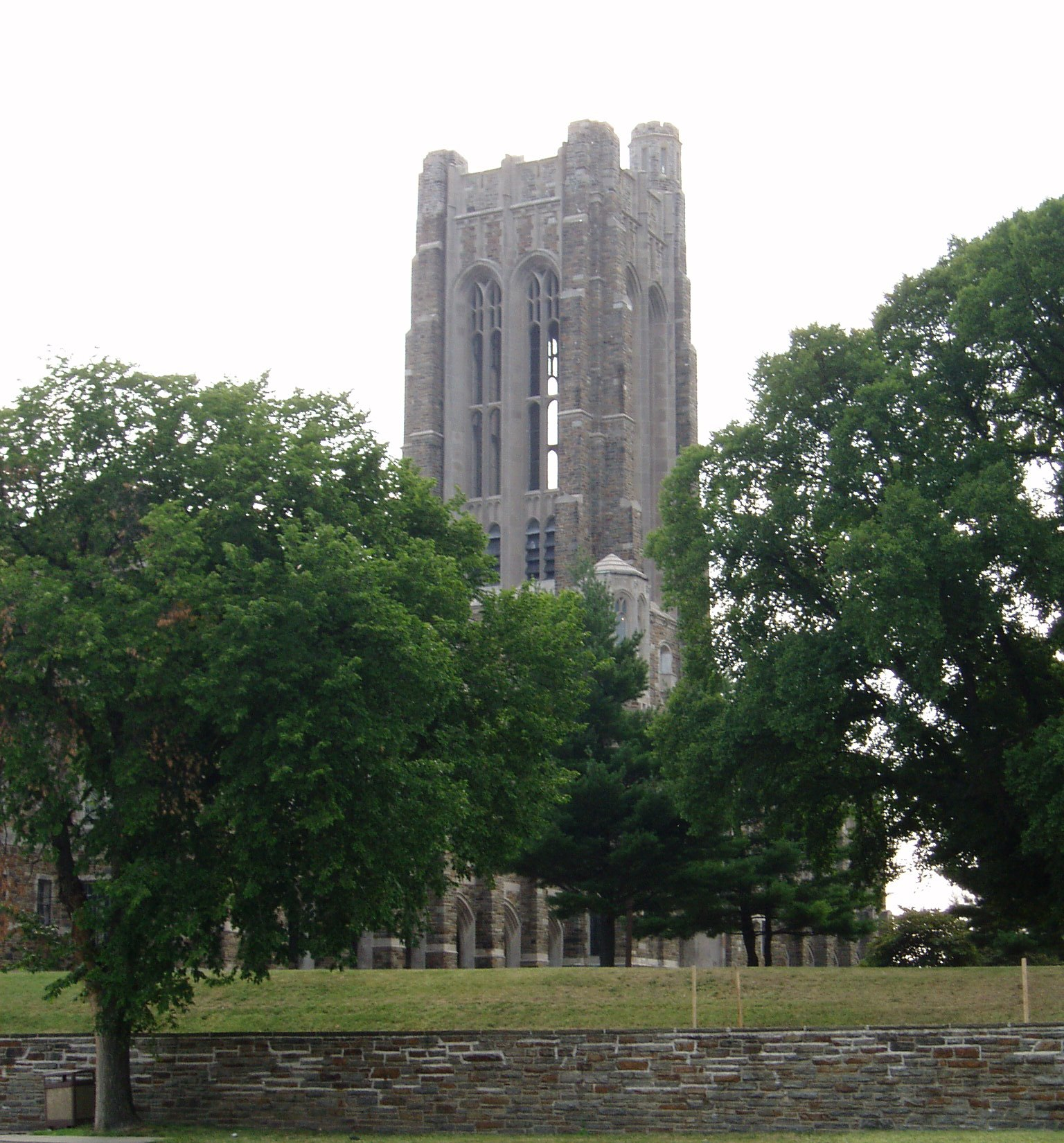
The Castle on the Hill

By World War I, attendance in the school was rapidly increasing. An annex was added on 26th Street to alleviate overcrowding in the Howard Street building, but it was insufficient. Therefore, during the 1920s, alumni began campaigning to provide a proper building for the school, and in 1926, ground was broken for a massive Collegiate Gothic stone castle with a 38-acre (153,781 m^{2}) campus, on a hill in the newly annexed northeastern suburbs at 33rd Street and The Alameda. The four-level "Castle on the Hill", which was surmounted by a 150 ft (46 m) tower and designed by architects Buckler and Fenhagen, cost almost $3,000,000 and accommodated 2,500 students. The "castle" featured arched windows and cornices, cloisters, gargoyles, stained glass, mahogany paneling, plaster arches, chandeliers and terra cotta tiles and terrazzo floors with two courtyards and plans for additional wings and buildings.

Memorial plaque for BCC alumni who died in World War I

The following year, in 1927, the "Advanced Academic Course" ("A" Course) was introduced. Students in the "A" Course were able to enter their second year of college following their graduation. This program of study and its counterpart, the college preparatory course ("B" Course), became the backbone of City College's academic program for over 60 years. On April 10, 1928, after nearly two years of construction, "The Castle on the Hill" opened its doors to the students and faculty. The next year, the students published the first edition of The Collegian, City College's newspaper. The publication quickly became an indispensable part of student life and gained national attention, when it won second place in a contest sponsored by the Columbia Scholastic Press Association of Columbia University. The Collegian held the first place title between 1935 and 1939.

When Japan's attack on Pearl Harbor on December 7, 1941 led to U.S. entry into World War II, blood donor projects, stamp and bond drives, and the dedication of service flags gave the City College a wartime atmosphere. More than three-quarters of the students participated in the Victory Corps, which sponsored courses in communications, map reading, judo and the study of the poisonous and non-poisonous plants on Pacific islands. By the time the war ended in 1945, 4,667 City College students had served in the armed forces, 204 of whom lost their lives. The names of all of the fallen, including two Medal of Honor recipients, are inscribed on a bronze memorial, which sits today in the center of the school.

== Integration ==
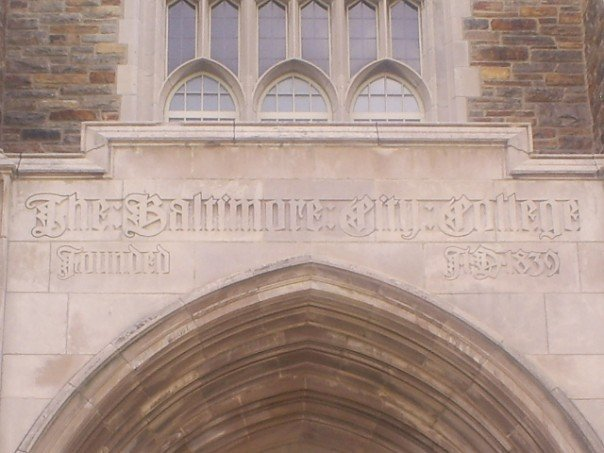
Baltimore City College Main Entrance, 2007

Following the landmark Supreme Court ruling in Brown v. Board of Education, the Baltimore City board of school commissioners was forced to desegregate the school system, which had been racially divided since the 1860s. As a result, 10 African-American students entered City College in September 1954, comprising 0.5% of the student population. A decade later, in the 1964–65 academic year, African-American students represented 30% of the student population.

In 1956 the school system also sent two African-American men to teach at the school: Eugene Parker, who coached for thirty years, and Pierre Davis, who left after one year but returned in 1971 as City College's first African-American principal.

Although African-American enrollment increased, the transition from the segregated system was not seamless. In 1964, enrollment in the selective "A" Course still skewed disproportionately to white students. Only six African Americans were enrolled that year compared with 110 Whites, and they were similarly underrepresented in extracurricular activities.

Such de facto segregation was a systemic problem in Baltimore throughout the 1960s. To address the problem, Superintendent Laurence G. Paquin proposed a reorganization of Baltimore's high schools. He called for the creation of 13 comprehensive high schools that would offer both vocational training and college preparatory classes, and the elimination of multiple academic tracks in high school. However, Paquin's proposal met stiff opposition from City College parents and alumni, who feared that his plan threatened the foundations of City College's academic program. Councilman William Donald Schaefer, an alumnus of City College, convened a City Council hearing on the proposal, which stymied Paquin's effort.

By the late 1970s, the school's population, academic program, and building were all in decline, in part reflecting the economic problems of the city as a whole. In 1977, the city school system allocated money to refurbish the school and bolster the college preparatory program. That same year the school system announced its intent to make City College coeducational; however, the all-male tradition did not end easily. Alumni argued for the uniqueness of a single-sex education system, and a task force studying the issue voted 11–6 in favor of keeping the all-male tradition. In a stunning reversal, the board of school commissioners voted to admit women citing constitutional concerns over equal rights. The following year City College enrolled women for the first time.

== Recent history ==
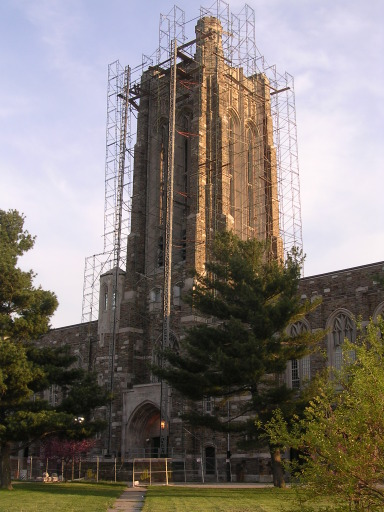
The Castle on the Hill, 2006

By 1990, the school's academic program was once again deteriorating and enrollment was declining. The Middle States Association of Colleges and Schools raised questions about the ability of City College to offer students an academically rigorous course of study. During this period of decline, the "A" Course was discontinued by Principal Joseph Antenson, who contended that the program was racially discriminatory—an argument Paquin had made nearly three decades earlier—and opted for a standardized curriculum. However, the change did little to improve the school; therefore, in 1992, the school system hired a private contractor to run City College. That action was a part of the unsuccessful "Educational Alternatives program", which lasted for about 14 months. Then, in 1994, Joseph M. Wilson was appointed principal of City College. Wilson, with the aid of alumni and parents, was able to secure more funding and autonomy from the school system, which were used to redesign the curriculum and to introduce the IB Diploma Program in 1998.

The new academic program attracted increased attention to the school. In 2000, City College was recognized as a National Blue Ribbon School by the U.S. Department of Education, which placed it among the best schools in the country. The following year, the Toronto National Post reported on the two-month-long task of searching for the perfect high school in Great Britain, the United States, and Canada. It "never found the perfect school ... [however] we found a few outstanding ones," the paper concluded. And one of these—the subject of a prominent feature article—was City College, led by Wilson. The school's rankings in Newsweek's report of the nation's top high schools improved during this period. In 2003, it was ranked 593. Three years later, in 2006, City College was ranked 206, and in 2007 it was ranked 258. Given an estimated 27,500 public high schools across the nation, in 2007 ranking placed City College in the top one percent of all high schools. In its criteria, Newsweek divided the number of Advanced Placement and International Baccalaureate tests taken by the number of graduating seniors. The magazine stated that the measure showed schools which were committed to helping students take college-level courses.

In addition to the academic resurgence of the school, the building was recognized for its historical and architectural interest. The Castle on the Hill was honored in 2003 by being placed on the National Register of Historic Places. This designation coincided with the 75th anniversary of the structure and campus as well as City College's 165th year of existence. On April 24, 2007 it earned the additional distinction of being listed as a Baltimore City Landmark. Mayor Sheila Dixon stated that: "The castle on the hill, as City College is known, is truly a historic landmark. It is worthy of preservation and acknowledgment."

Baltimore City College, 2007

The landmark status bill was passed by the city council in accordance with a recommendation made by the council's staff, which found that the building dates from a historic and architecturally significant period. This new status prevents the building's exterior from being altered without the approval of the city's Commission for Historical and Architectural Preservation. However, the previous year City College was a victim of vandalism at the hands of a group of children ranging in age from 8 to 15, as a renovation of the school neared completion. In the summer of 2007, scenes from the 2008 sequel Step Up 2, set at the fictional Maryland School for the Arts, were filmed at City College.

In 2007 controversy about the academic program arose, when members of the Baltimore City College Alumni Association argued that the IB Program was diverting a significant amount of the school's resources to benefit a fraction of the student population. Approximately 30 students out of 1300 were enrolled in the full IB Diploma Program at City College. Some members also argued that the rigidity of the program did not give students enough flexibility. Citing these concerns, the alumni association encouraged the school to replace the IB Program with the "A course" and expand the number of Advanced Placement courses offered. In December 2008 City announced the donation of $50,000 by alumnus H. Corbin Gwaltney '39. The founder and longtime editor of Johns Hopkins Magazine, Gwaltney's donation will benefit the modernization of City's library.

== Principals ==
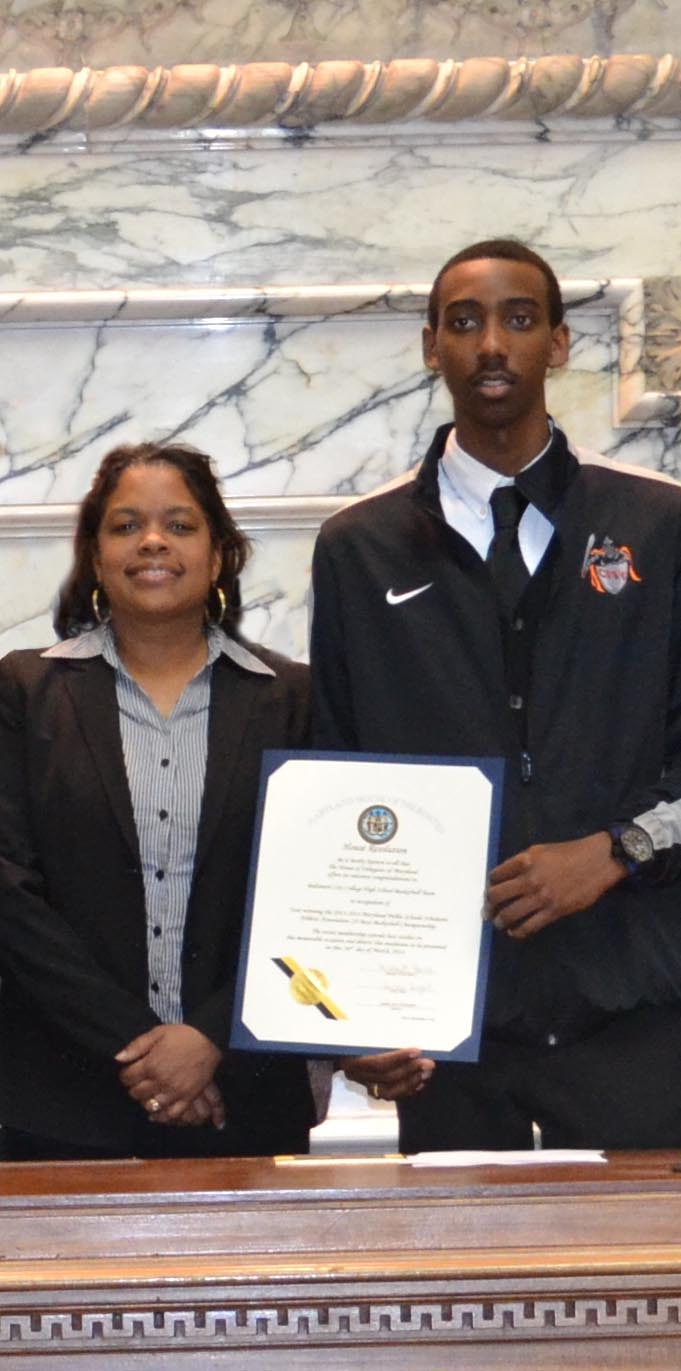
Baltimore City College Principal Cindy Harcum and Varsity basketball Captain Timmy Bond at ceremony in the Maryland House of Delegates, March 2014

- Dr. Nathan C. Brooks (1839–1849)
- Rev. Dr. Francis G. Waters (1849–1853)
- John A. Getty (1853)
- George Morrison (1853–1857)
- Dr. Thomas D. Baird (1857–1873)
- William Elliott, Jr. (1873–1890)
- Francis A. Soper (1890–1911)
- Dr. Wilbur F. Smith (1911–1926)
- Dr. Frank R. Blake^{†} (1926–1932)
- Dr. Philip H. Edwards^{†} (1932–1948)
- Chester H. Katenkamp^{†} (1948–1956)
- Henry T. Yost^{†} (1956–1963)
- Dr. Julius G. Hlubb^{†} (1963–1966)

- Dr. Jerome G. Denaburg^{†} (1966–1969)
- Dr. Pierre H. Davis (1970–1974)
- Maurice Wells^{†} (1974–1976)
- Isaiah E. White (1976–1977)
- Gordon Stills (1977–1978)
- Dr. Solomon Lausch (1978–1988)
- Jean Johnson (1988–1990), (1992–1994)
- Dr. Joseph Antenson (1990–1993)
- Joseph M. Wilson, J.D. (1994–2004)
- Dr. James Scofield^{†} (2005)
- Dr. Deborah L. Wortham (2005)
- Timothy Dawson (2006–2010)
- Ms. Cindy Harcum^{†} (2010–present)

^{†} indicates principals who attended Baltimore City College
