= Baltimore Urban Debate League =

Non-profit, urban debate league

- Voice • Power • Purpose

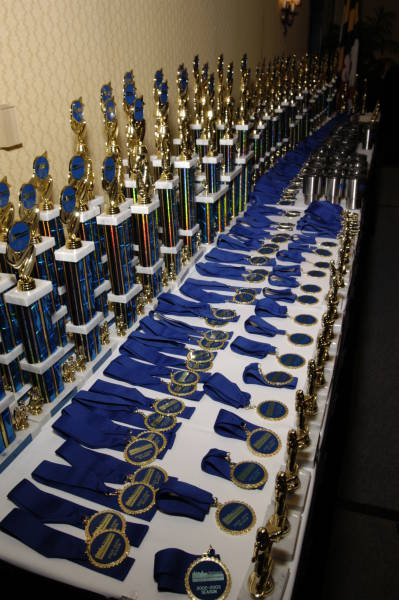
- 2006 awards table
- Formation: 1999
- Founder: Open Society Institute; Fund for Educational Excellence
- Purpose: Policy debate
- Location: Baltimore, Maryland, U.S.
- Region served: Baltimore City Public School System
- Key people: Pamela Block, Executive Director
- Website: www.budl.org

The Baltimore Urban Debate League (BUDL, pronounced "boodle"), is an American, non profit, urban debate league that aims to educate and mentor inner city middle school and high school students in the Baltimore, Maryland area.

The main focus of the organization is to teach students policy debate. Currently the league serves approximately 51 schools in Baltimore, and has been nationally recognized by several organizations for spreading debate in the city's public schools and increasing awareness nationwide about urban debate.

== History ==
The league was started in 1999 by a grant from the Fund for Educational Excellence in collaboration with George Soros' Open Society Institute. Only 8 high schools and 90 students participated in the first year. Since then the program has expanded to over 35 high schools, 21 middle schools, and numerous students across Baltimore. Related Debate League programs have also been created across the United States in response to the success of BUDL. The funding has also expanded to include Towson University, Morgan State University, and the Barkley Forum. Many students in the league have gone on to compete in national and international tournaments held by other debate leagues and associations.

Also, in the 2005–2006 season, BUDL successfully incorporated the high school debate model into several middle schools around the city. Middle school students are able to take advantage of many of the opportunities afforded to high school debaters, including the opportunity to go to their very own debate camp called "B'More Debate" in order to improve their debate skills and to encourage continued participation in BUDL. The middle school camp happens during the summer months and has a very similar format to BUDL's high school camp, and is held at Towson University.

== Debate format ==
=== High school ===
At the high school level, students debate according to policy debate guidelines. Each season one resolution is established by the National Forensic League and National Catholic Forensic League. There are three divisions on the high school level: novice, junior varsity (JV), and varsity. The three divisions have the same timing conventions for debate rounds, the only exception being preparation time (novice get ten minutes, JV and varsity get five minutes). Also, the JV and varsity divisions may use any affirmative case they want throughout the competitive year, and so could the novice division at once point. In the 2003–2004 season however, new rules mandated that the novice division could only use one affirmative case per season.

=== Middle school ===
BUDL uses its own format for the middle school level since there is no national organization that governs or regulates middle school debate competition. They still have the same number of divisions, and follow the basic format of policy debate, but instead of one resolution every year, one topic is chosen every month. The league narrows it down to a pool of topics, and all of the member schools vote on which one they would like to debate. The speech and cross examination times are also slightly altered.

Since BUDL has one of only a few middle school leagues in the country, its middle school debaters are only able to debate other middle schools around the city, until they reach the high school level.

== Member schools ==
All high/middle schools that compete in year-round tournaments are a part of the Baltimore City Public School System. As a member school of BUDL, each team can participate in year-round tournaments sanctioned by the league and the high school students can compete in tourneys with the Baltimore Catholic Forensic League. No school has to pay dues to be a part of the league and it covers the cost of BCFL dues so that debaters may participate in their tournaments. The league also pays for travel to out-of-state tournaments along the East Coast. During the summer, BUDL pays for the travel of groups of debaters to go to debate camp as well. At least once a year, BUDL holds inter-league competition with the BCFL and its schools in one big tournament.

BUDL also has a National Forensic League chair, headed by debate coach Rosemary Steck, so that BUDL debaters may participate in qualifying tournaments to compete in national tournaments. At the end of each year, BUDL awards season trophies, medals, and certificates for the progress teams and individuals have made on their particular squad.

=== League champions ===
The year's champion is decided by how many cumulative wins each school accumulates from each individual team over the season in BUDL tournaments, not including out-of-state or BCFL tournaments. The winners are announced at the league's annual banquet held in May.

Year	Champion
1999–2000	Northwestern High School
2000–2001	Forest Park High School
2001–2002	Walbrook High School
2002–2003	Walbrook High School
2003–2004	Baltimore City College
2004–2005	Baltimore City College
2005–2006	Mergenthaler Vocational-Technical High School (Mervo)
2006–2007	Baltimore City College
2007–2008	Baltimore City College
2008–2009	Baltimore City College
2009–2010	Baltimore City College

Walbrook High School was the first high school in BUDL history to hold "top school" for an entire debate season (2002–2003). Baltimore City College became the second school to do so and has held the title consecutively for four years.

== Programs ==
=== Debate camps ===
BUDL offers two separate debate camps that operate on different dates in the summer months. Since 2000, BUDL offered "B'More Debate", formerly called the Towson International Debate Institute (TIDI), which is primarily for high school students. Since 2006, it has created a middle school debate camp of the same name which has a very similar format to the high school camp.

B'More Debate was initially offered only to students in BUDL, but throughout the years has expanded to other students around the country. The camp is held during the summer months and lasts two weeks. The middle school camp is held after the high school camp and is a week long.

=== Countdown to College ===
Since 2002, BUDL has offered a college and SAT preparatory program called Countdown to College (C2C). The program is a coordination of league staff, Mother Seton Academy, and St. Ignatius Loyola Academy. The program provides free SAT workshops, college labs, college tours, and invites speakers to come talk to juniors and graduating seniors out of BUDL. C2C operates in the fall, spring, and summer, and thus far has been a huge success with college matriculation in to most 4-year universities in Maryland.

== Accomplishments ==
In 2001, three students that had competed in BUDL were able to, because of their achievements in the League, go to Russia to compete in the seventh International Education Association's Summer Debate Camp.

BUDL received national media coverage on the news magazine 60 Minutes. The segment featured debaters from Walbrook High School and their coach Angelo Brooks. The students talked about how debate had changed their lives and inspired them to go to get better grades in school and go to college.

In the 2006–2007 season, of the seniors who debated, 99 percent graduated on time. Of the 99 percent who graduated on time, 88 percent were admitted to college. The reading scores of all students improved over the school year, but debate students improved by 25 percent more than non-debaters. The results from debate students also generally improved regardless of how well - or poorly - they were doing in school before they began debating. BUDL students also earned over $100,000 in college scholarships in 2007.

Local Baltimore news outlets have covered events, speeches, and public debates held by the league. Possibly some of the most notable coverage happened during the 2004 crisis at Walbrook High. The school had recently changed the principal, due to criminal accusations against the old principal Dr. Andrey Bundley, and was replaced by Shirley Cathorne. As a result, multiple fights, fires, one shooting, and overall disrupt of the school environment occurred. The debate team was featured prominently in news stories to highlight its successes at the school.

The league also has a "Public Debate Month" held in May every year. The goal at the end of the month is to have 100 public debates around the city. In February 2004 then mayor Martin O'Malley made a commemorative public debate month during their annual fundraiser. In May 2005, to commemorate its annual "Public Debate Month", the league held its first "Public Debate Tournament" at the amphitheater in Baltimore's Inner Harbor. The winner of the contest was a team from Baltimore City College that defeated the runner up team composed of students from Digital Harbor and Mervo.

In January 2007 the league was honored by the White House with the "Coming Up Taller Award". The award recognizes outstanding arts and humanities programs around the country with a $10,000 grant.

In March 2008, BUDL alumni Dayvon Love and Deven Cooper, became the first team of African Americans to win the Cross Examination Debate Association National Tournament.

In Spring 2010, the Baltimore City College team of William Stokes and Nicholas Vail became the first BUDL team invited to the Tournament of Champions.

In Spring 2013, the Baltimore City College team of Dikshant Malla and Sophie Bauerschmidt-Sweeney became the first BUDL team to win a national championship at the National Association for Urban Debate Leagues and then went on to win a second national championship at the 2013 National Catholic Forensic League Grand National Tournament.

== See also ==
- Competitive debate in the United States
