= Bancroft Literary Association and Carrollton-Wight Literary Society =

Baltimore City College student groups

- Formation: 1876 (Bancroft), 1878 (Carrollton-Wight)
- Location: Baltimore, Maryland
- Official language: English
- Key people: Faculty Advisor: Patrick Daniels; Other officers: Coaches: Fernando Kirkman, Shaun Faries, Amber Phelps, Ameena Ruffin, David Neustadt, Lawrence Grandpre, Beth Mendenhall
- Parent organization: Baltimore City College

The Bancroft Literary Association and the Carrollton-Wight Literary Society are two competitive forensic societies at the Baltimore City College and are the formal names for the school's speech and debates teams. Founded in 1876 and 1878 respectively, the Bancroft and Carrollton-Wight Societies are the oldest literary societies at a public high school in the United States. Historically, the two societies competed mainly between themselves. The rivalry culminated each year with an annual debate. In the 20th century, the societies began to compete with other secondary schools and some universities. At the time, the teams' most notable rival was Baltimore Polytechnic Institute, City College's chief rival in sports and academics. The Bancroft and Carrollton-Wight Societies disbanded for a time in the 1980s and early-1990s, but were revived in the late-1990s. Baltimore City College is a charter member of the Chesapeake Region of the National Forensics League and the National Catholic Forensic League, and is founding member of the Baltimore Catholic Forensic League and the Baltimore Urban Debate League.

The Bancroft Literary Association and Carrollton-Wight Literary Society now exist as the Baltimore City College Speech and Debate team. Bancroft members compete in speech events which include Dramatic Interpretation of Literature, Declamation, Extemporaneous Speaking, and Original Oratory. The Carrollton-Wight Literary Society competes in debate events which include Student Congress, Lincoln-Douglas Debate, Policy Debate, and Public Forum Debate. Although, there are some students that participate in both societies, a rivalry persists between members of the two societies. Members of the societies rarely, if ever, compete directly against each other, preferring to participate in interscholastic competitions.

In recent years, Baltimore City College Speech and Debate has become one of the most well-regarded high school programs in country. Since 2010, City has earned multiple bids to the Tournament of Champions (TOC) and advanced to the final round at a number of major national tournaments, including the National Catholic Forensic League Grand National Tournament. In 2013, Baltimore City College Debate won the National Association of Urban Debate Leagues (NAUDL) policy debate national championship. The program is currently under the direction of Patrick Daniels, City College's Director of Speech and Debate.

== History ==
The first student literary society at Baltimore City College was called the Peabody Lyceum. The group held its first meeting on October 4, 1859, under the direction of Professor Lovejoy. Meetings were conducted using parliamentary procedure with members being fined for poor decorum. Admission to the society was based on an individual's ranking in his class. The society would request the names of the top performing students and then invite those students to appear before the body. After a student's appearance before the society, admission would be debated and if the student garnered a 2/3 vote, the individual would be granted membership to the Peabody Lyceum. Members were selected to perform declamations or to debate one another. The society continued for nearly a decade until June 11, 1869, when with tensions in the group mounting over the removal of one of its members, the president of the society moved to adjourn sine die. A second literary society formed several years later, calling itself the Sheppard Society, but it dissolved shortly before the creation of the Bancroft Society.

Baltimore City College's modern speech and debate program began with the creation of the Bancroft Literary Association in 1876. The society was named for George Bancroft, the American historian and U.S. Secretary of the Navy. At that time it was the only extracurricular activity at the school. William Elliott, Jr., principal, explained the role of the Bancroft Literary Association in the annual report to the Board of School Commissioners in 1878:

[The Bancroft Literary Association] has for its object that culture which is afforded by the preparation of essays on various subjects and discussions of questions of general interest. It exercises are conducted according to approved parliamentary usages, and are characterized by exhibitions of ability in the youthful aspirants for forensic honors, that are very gratifying.

A second competing society was established in 1878 as the Carrollton Society, named after Charles Carroll of Carrollton. In 1897, following the passing of Professor Charles C. Wight, professor of English and History, the Carrollton Society was renamed the Carrollton-Wight Literary Society. An annual debate was held between the two societies starting in 1880. Much like their predecessor the Peabody Lyceum, the societies conducted meetings according to prescribed parliamentary procedure. However, unlike their predecessor, membership to the societies was open to all members of the student body.

Though the societies competed principally between themselves, several debates with other high schools were conducted in the early 20th century. In 1906, after several years of defeat, City won its first debate against rival Central High School of Philadelphia in the so-called "inter-city debate". The topic of the debate was, "Resolved, that it would be to the best interests of the people of the United States for the Government to own and operate its railroads." Three debaters from Central affirmed the resolution, while three opposing debaters from City negated the resolution. The panel of judges included John P. Poe, former Maryland Attorney General and dean of the University of Maryland School of Law.

In 1908, City College met rival Baltimore Polytechnic Institute in the first of a series of annual debates. The debate against Poly was considered by members to be the highlight of the year. The members of the literary societies continued seeking opponents at other secondary schools and also debated against several college teams. In 1935, the societies triumphed over the freshmen team from New York University. In the same year, the societies also competed against Johns Hopkins University, George Washington University, University of Maryland, and Washington College. Though Bancroft/Carrollton-Wight members began to routinely compete against other schools, the societies continued to hold an annual debate. The fiftieth annual debate of the Bancroft and Carrollton-Wight Societies coincided with the centennial of City in 1939. In addition to providing forums for the development of student debaters, the societies focused on declamation and oratory. In 1914, the societies began bestowing medals upon four graduating seniors with the best declamatory, debating, extemporaneous speaking, and essay skills.

== Recent history ==
The Bancroft/Carollton-Wight Literary Societies remained active through the 1970s, but became dormant in the 1980s and early-1990s. In 1997, largely due to the leadership of former faculty member Donald Koch, the fundraising efforts of B.C.C alumnus and former debater Gilbert Sandler, and the financial support of the Abell Foundation, the speech and debate program was reactivated. In April 2008, the Baltimore Community Foundation announced its initial endowment of the Gilbert Sandler Fund for B.C.C. Speech and Debate in honor of Sandler, an alumnus and longtime supporter of the program. The endowment is intend to provide financial support in perpetuity and currently has a principal of $252,000.

=== 2010 Season ===
In 2010, Baltimore City College earned two bids to the Tournament of Champions (TOC), the most elite debate competition in the United States. The policy debate team of William Stokes and Nicholas Vail earned the first TOC bid in the history of Baltimore City at the Wake Forest National Earlybird Tournament. In the same year, the policy debate team of Kaine Cherry and David Neustadt earned the school's second TOC bid at the Lakeland District Invitational. In September, debater Gareth Imparato earned City's first-ever invitation to the Lincoln-Douglass Tournament of Champions by advancing to the semi-finals at the Wake Forest Earlybird and the Yale Invitational Tournaments.

Two Baltimore City College policy debaters advanced to the final round National Catholic Forensic League Grand National Tournament, a tournament which also featured Bancroft/Carollton-Wight members Gareth Imparato participating in Lincoln-Douglas Debate and Emma Koch participating in Declamation, where she reached quarterfinals and was ranked 14th in the United States. City College also qualified two policy debate teams for the National Forensic League Tournament in Kansas City, MO.

=== 2011 Season ===
In 2011, Baltimore City College Speech and Debate returned to the Tournament of Champions(TOC) for the second consecutive in which the school competed in two debate events: Policy and Lincoln-Douglass. Additionally, the policy debate team of Dikshant Malla and David Neustadt continued the Knights' impressive season by advancing to quarter-final round at the National Association of Urban Debate Leagues Championship. Neustadt was recognized as the 11th place speaker in the country. City College Speech and Debate also qualified eight students to the National Catholic Forensic League Grand National Tournament.

=== 2012 Season ===
In 2012, City College Debate earned its third consecutive invitation to the TOC. The Knights also finished as runners-up at the National Urban Debate League Championship. Darian Murray and Corwin Jones, Jr. participated in the Great Space Debate at the National Air and Space Museum in Washington, D.C., where they finished in second place. Baltimore City College also qualified two teams for the 2012 National Catholic Forensic League Grand National Tournament. City College was the tournament's host school and finished with the competition with a policy debate team finishing 3rd in the nation. Baltimore City College Speech and Debate earned the 2012 Baltimore Urban Debate League policy debate championship, finishing the tournament with the first- and second-place teams. Two Baltimore City College policy debate teams qualified for the National Forensic League National Tournament held in Indianapolis, IN, where David Neustadt was awarded 10th place speaker.

=== 2013 Season ===
The 2013 debate season was one of the finest years in the long and storied history of City College Speech and Debate. The school again earned two bids to the Tournament of Champions (TOC). Dikshant Malla became the first City College debater to qualify for the TOC in three separate years. Two City College policy debate teams were crowned co-champions at the National Catholic Forensic League qualifiers in Baltimore. For the second straight year, Baltimore City College qualified two teams to the National Forensic League National Tournament. The team of Dikshant Malla and Sophie Bauerschmidt Sweeney won the 2013 National Association of Urban Debate Leagues policy debate national championship, which was held at Georgetown University in Washington, D.C. In 2013, Baltimore City College also earned the second of two consecutive Baltimore Urban Debate League championships.

=== Mock trial ===
Mock trial was not a traditional part of the literary societies, but has been incorporated into the modern speech and debate program. Teams from City College have represented Baltimore City in the Maryland State Championships twice since 2001. In 2001, City's team advanced to the state mock trials finals. The team advanced to the state championships again in 2006, after defeating the 2005 State Champion Squad from Richard Montgomery High School. In 2013, Baltimore City College also advanced to the finals, but fell by one-point to the Gilman School.

== Notable alumni ==
Bancroft Literary Association

- Dr. John H. Latane, professor of history, dean of faculty, Johns Hopkins University (1913–1932)
- Dr. Charles William Emil Miller, American classicist and philologist, Johns Hopkins University (1891–1934)
- Harry W. Nice, governor, Maryland
- David Rubenstein, founder The Carlyle Group
- Dr. David E. Weglein, Superintendent, Baltimore City Public School System (1925–1946)
- John Archibald Wheeler, theoretical physicist, Wolf Prize

Carrollton-Wight Literary Society

- Matthew Crenson, political scientist, Johns Hopkins University
- Robert I. H. Hammerman, chief judge, Baltimore City Circuit Court (1984–1998).
- Dr. Arthur Maass, political scientist, Harvard University (1948–1984)
- Charles E. Moylan, Jr., Maryland Court of Special Appeals (1971–2000)
- Eli Siegel, founder of Aesthetic Realism

== See also ==
- Debate
- Literary society
- Oratory
