= Melissa Wade =

American intercollegiate debate coach

- Occupations: Executive Director of Forensics (ret. 2015), National Intercollegiate Debate Coach
- Awards: Thomas Jefferson Award

Academic background
- Education: Emory University

Academic work
- Discipline: Forensics

Melissa Wade has been the Director of Forensics at Emory University, and the head coach of the school's award-winning policy debate team, the Barkley Forum, since 1972. She has been awarded every national coaching award in her field, and has been honored for her contributions to minority and women's participation in debate and forensics. Wade has coached several national debate champions. She retired in 2015.

Wade is a founder and developer of the urban debate league movement, as well as the Executive co-director of the National Debate Project.

She is originally from Houston, Texas, and is a graduate of Emory with undergraduate and multiple graduate degrees.
