= IMPACT Coalition =

- Founded: 1991
- Purpose: Policy debate
- Location: New York, New York United States
- Region served: New York City Public Schools
- Website: www.impactcoalition.org

The IMPACT Coalition is an urban debate league (UDL) based in the New York metropolitan area. It organises debating competitions and provides supporting services.

== History ==
The organisation founded in 1991 to facilitate policy debate competitions among high schools in the New York metropolitan area. It also collaborated with higher educational institutes in New York, such as Columbia University, Rockland Community College, and Queens College to create a debating program called the NY Coalition of Colleges.

In 1994, the organisation created a program called the Public Forum Debate League (PFDL) to help geographically remote students travel to debate competitions. The organisation also collaborated with Yeshiva University to facilitate debate competitions with religious groups.

== See also ==
- Competitive debate in the United States
