= UDL =

UDL may refer to:

- Universal Data Link, a file format storing information about database connections
- Universal Design for Learning, an educational framework
- University of Lleida (Universitat de Lleida), a university in Lleida, Spain
- Urban debate league, a high school debate teams group in the United States
- User defined literals, ways to customize literals in C++ programming language since C++11.
- Andal Junction railway station (station code: UDL), West Bengal, India
