= Roscoe Smith =

American professional basketball player (born 1991)

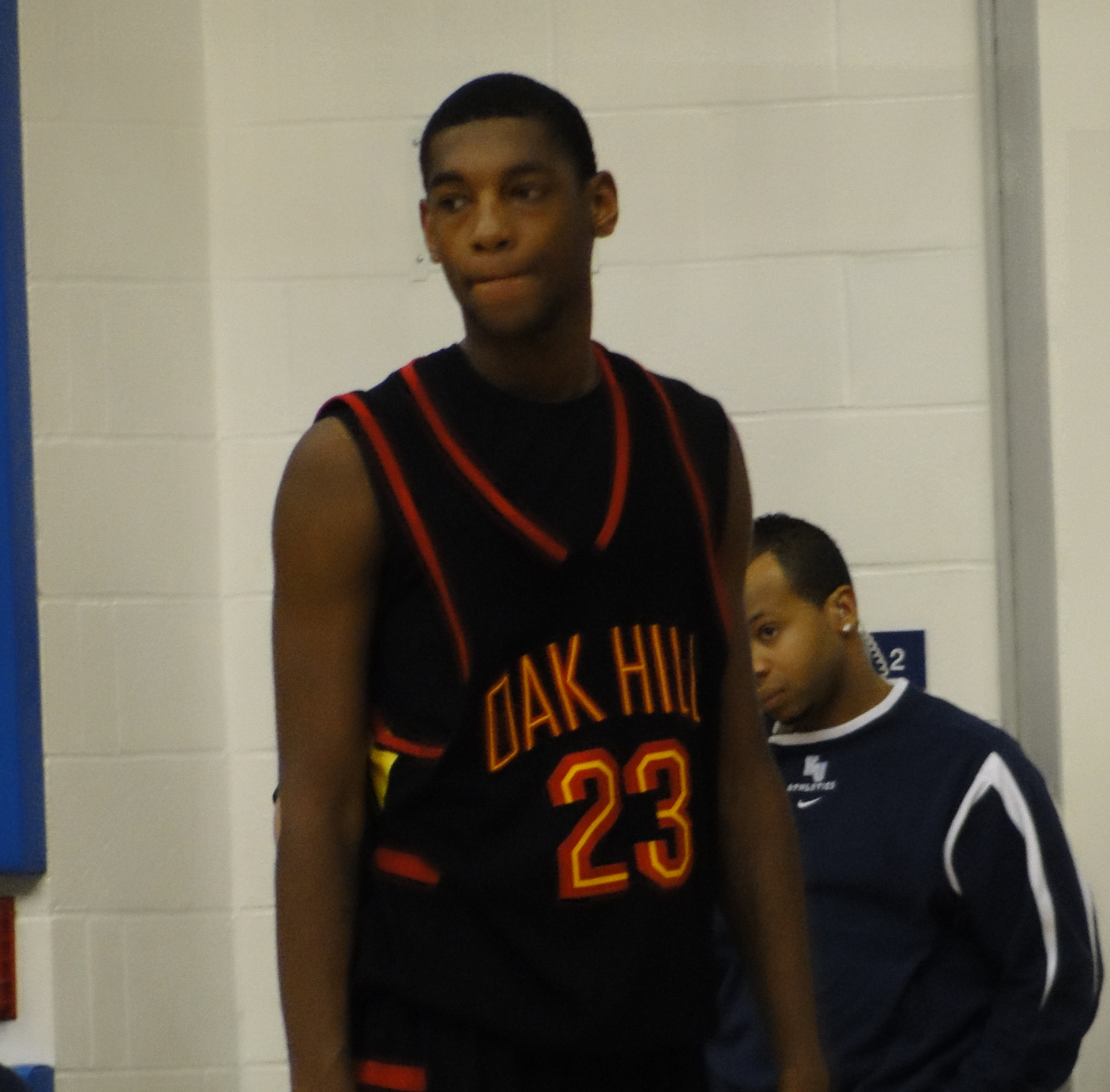
- Smith with Oak Hill Academy in 2009

No. 88 – RANS PIK
- Position: Small forward / power forward
- League: Indonesian Basketball League

Personal information
- Born: May 1, 1991 (age 35) Baltimore, Maryland, U.S.
- Listed height: 6 ft 9 in (2.06 m)
- Listed weight: 202 lb (92 kg)

Career information
- High school: Walbrook (Baltimore, Maryland); Oak Hill Academy (Mouth of Wilson, Virginia)
- College: UConn (2010–2012); UNLV (2013–2014)
- NBA draft: 2014: undrafted
- Playing career: 2014–present

Career history
- 2014–2015: Los Angeles D-Fenders
- 2015: Ironi Nes Ziona
- 2015–2016: Nea Kifissia
- 2016–2017: Los Angeles D-Fenders
- 2017: Delaware 87ers
- 2017–2018: Erie BayHawks
- 2018–2019: Greensboro Swarm
- 2022: ORC Beit Jala
- 2023-present: RANS PIK Basketball

Career highlights
- NBA D-League All-Rookie Third Team (2015); NBA D-League All-Star (2015); NCAA champion (2011)
- Stats at Basketball Reference

Roscoe R. Smith (born May 1, 1991) is an American professional basketball player playing for the RANS PIK Basketball of the Indonesian Basketball League. He played college basketball for the University of Nevada, Las Vegas (UNLV). As a freshman, Smith was a starter on the Connecticut Huskies' 2011 national championship team.

== High school and college career ==
A 6'8" small forward born in Baltimore, Maryland, Smith attended Walbrook High School through his junior season, averaging 21.4 points and 11.0 rebounds per game his last season there. He then moved to prep basketball power Oak Hill Academy.

After fielding recruiting offers from a number of schools, he chose to play for Hall of Fame coach Jim Calhoun at the University of Connecticut. As a freshman, Smith played in all 41 Husky games (starting 33) and averaged 5.7 points, 5.5 rebounds and 1.5 blocks per game. In the 2011 NCAA Tournament, Smith was a part of the starting unit led by All-American Kemba Walker that won the National Championship.

Smith returned in the 2011–12 season, but saw his minutes decrease with the addition of highly touted freshman Andre Drummond. He averaged 4.4 points and 3.3 rebounds per game. Following the season, it was announced that Connecticut would be banned from postseason play in the 2012–13 season due to issues with new NCAA Academic Progress Rate guidelines. Several upperclassmen chose to leave the program, including Smith, who transferred to UNLV.

After sitting out the 2012–13 season per NCAA transfer rules, Smith joined the Runnin' Rebels for the 2013–14 season. He finished in the top five nationally in rebounding, finishing the season averaging 10.9 rebounds per game. Following the season, Smith decided to bypass his final year of eligibility and entered the 2014 NBA draft.

== Professional career ==
=== Los Angeles D-Fenders ===
After going undrafted in the 2014 NBA draft, Smith joined the Los Angeles Lakers for the 2014 NBA Summer League. On September 23, 2014, he signed with the Lakers. However, he was later waived by the Lakers on October 25, 2014. On November 1, 2014, he was acquired by the Los Angeles D-Fenders as an affiliate player. On February 12, 2015, he was named to the Futures All-Star team for the 2015 NBA D-League All-Star Game as a replacement for James Michael McAdoo.

=== Ironi Nes Ziona B.C. ===
On August 13, 2015, Smith signed with Ironi Nes Ziona of the Israeli Basketball Premier League.

=== Nea Kifissia B.C. ===
Smith moved to the Greek club Nea Kifissia.

=== Los Angeles D-Fenders ===
On October 30, Smith was reacquired by the Los Angeles D-Fenders.

=== Delaware 87ers ===
On January 15, 2017, the Los Angeles D-Fenders traded Smith to the Delaware 87ers.

=== Erie Bay Hawks ===
On November 7, 2017, Smith signed with the Erie Bay Hawks after they waived Chris Braswell. In a 3 team trade Smith was moved to the Greensboro Swarm.

=== Greensboro Swarm ===
On January 13, 2019, Smith was waived by the Swarm.

=== ORC Beit Jala ===
On March 9, 2022, Smith signed with the Arab Orthodox Club Beit Jala, in the Palestinian Basketball Premier League .

== Career statistics ==
=== Domestic leagues ===
Season	Team	League	GP	MPG	FG%	3P%	FT%	RPG	APG	SPG	BPG	PPG
2014-15	Los Angeles D-Fenders	D-League	49	35.7	.549	.265	.730	11.0	1.0	1.0	.7	18.1
