= Baltimore City College =

Location
- 3220 The Alameda; also geographically: 33rd Street and The Alameda; Baltimore, Maryland 21218; United States; 39.325663°N 76.597338°W

Information
- Type: College preparatory school; IB World School; public; secondary school; selective school
- Motto: Palmam Qui Meruit Ferat ("He who has earned the palm, let him bear it")
- Founded: 1839; 187 years ago
- School district: Baltimore City Public Schools
- CEEB code: 210035
- NCES School ID: 240009000150
- Principal: Dr. Sedrick Smith
- Teaching staff: 83 FTE (2022–23)
- Grades: 9–12
- Gender: Co-educational (all-male from 1839 until 1979)
- Enrollment: 1,497 (2022–23)
- Campus size: 38 acres (0.15 km^{2})
- Campus type: Urban
- Colors: Black and orange
- Athletics conference: MPSSAA (3A)
- Mascot: The Black Knight
- Team name: Knights
- Rival: Baltimore Polytechnic Institute
- Accreditation: Middle States Association of Colleges and Schools
- USNWR ranking: 460 (2022–23)
- Newspaper: The Collegian (est. 1929)
- Yearbook: The Green Bag (est. 1896; oldest public high school yearbook in USA)
- Budget: $13.64 million (FY23-24)
- Affiliations: Advanced Placement; International Baccalaureate
- Website: baltimorecitycollege.us

Baltimore City College, known colloquially as City, City College, and B.C.C., is a college preparatory school with a classical liberal arts focus in Baltimore, Maryland. Opened in October 1839, B.C.C. is one of oldest active public high schools in the United States. City College is a public exam school and an International Baccalaureate World School at which students in the ninth and tenth grades participate in the IB Middle Years Programme while students in the eleventh and twelfth grades participate in the IB Diploma Programme.

The school is situated on Collegian Hill, its 38 acres (0.15 km^{2}) hilltop campus located in the Coldstream-Homestead-Montebello neighborhood in Northeast Baltimore. The main academic campus building, a designated National Historic Landmark, is constructed of granite and limestone in a Collegiate Gothic architectural style and features a 200-foot-tall (61 m) Gothic tower.

== History ==
=== 1800s ===
==== Founding and Early Years (1839–1850s) ====
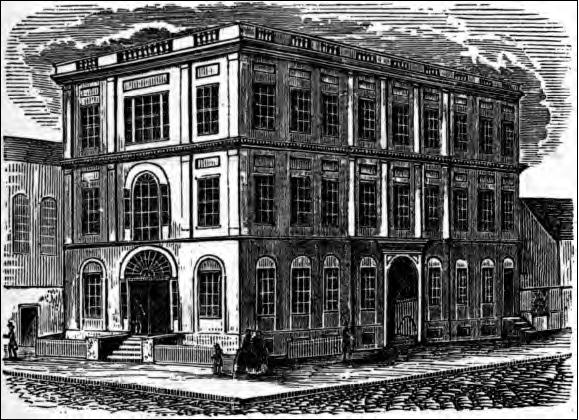
An 1869 print of Central High School of Baltimore, later renamed Baltimore City College; the old Assembly Rooms building was built in 1797.

In response to growing public demand for advanced education, the Baltimore City Council unanimously passed a resolution on March 7, 1839, to establish a public high school. "The High School" opened on October 20, 1839, with 46 pupils and Nathan C. Brooks (1809–1898), a respected classics scholar and poet, serving as its first principal. Initially located on Courtland Street (now Saint Paul Street/Place), the school relocated multiple times in its first three years before returning to its original site. In 1843, the City Council allocated $23,000 (equivalent to $797,457 in 2025) to purchase the Assembly Rooms building at East Fayette and Holliday Streets for the school's permanent location.

==== Institutional Growth and Renaming (1850s–1860s) ====
In 1850, graduates were granted certificates of completion. The following year, the school's first official commencement ceremony was held at the Front Street Theatre. At this time, the school was renamed the "Central High School of Baltimore." Influential lawyer and orator Severn Teackle Wallis (1816–1894) served as the inaugural commencement speaker.

In 1865, the Baltimore City Council recommended renaming the school. In 1866, the name "The Baltimore City College" was officially adopted, and the academic track was expanded to five years.

Although not granted degree-conferring powers by the Maryland General Assembly, the school's advanced curriculum allowed many graduates to receive college-level credit, particularly at nearby Johns Hopkins University.

==== The Howard Street Era (1873–1892) ====
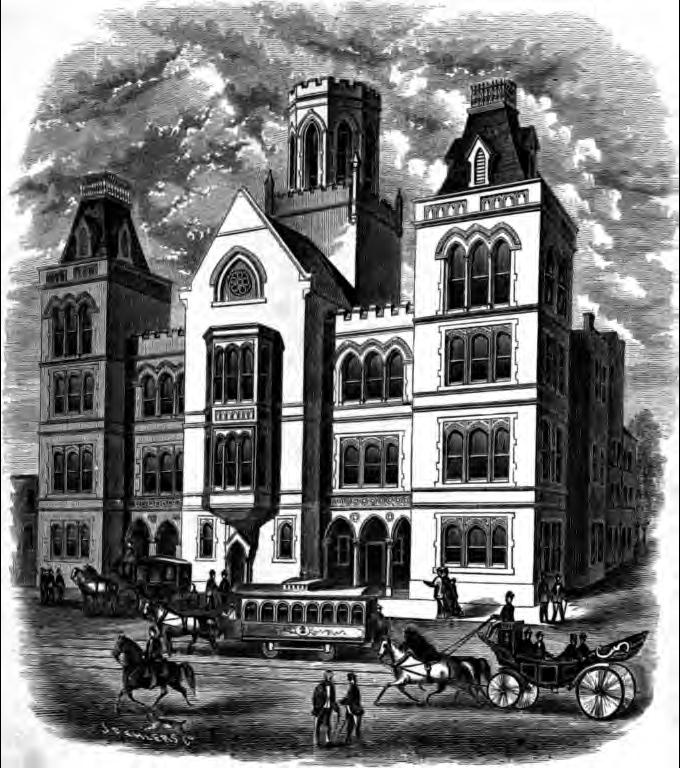
Rendering of the Howard Street building (1875–1892)

After a fire in 1873 destroyed the Assembly Rooms facility, the city acquired a new site on North Howard Street and allocated $150,000 (equivalent to $3.66 million in 2025) for a new building. Designed by Edmund G. Lind and George A. Frederick, the structure opened in 1875 in a Gothic Revival style.

This building collapsed in August 1892 during the construction of the Baltimore and Ohio Railroad's Howard Street Tunnel. Classes were temporarily relocated to buildings on Dolphin Street and North Paca Street.

==== New Downtown Campus (1899–1920s) ====
A new Romanesque Revival-style building was erected on the same Howard Street site, reoriented to face West Centre Street. Designed by Baldwin & Pennington, the red-brick facility quickly became overcrowded. An annex was built at East 26th Street for lower-level students.

=== 1900s ===
==== The Castle on Collegian Hill (1926–1940s) ====
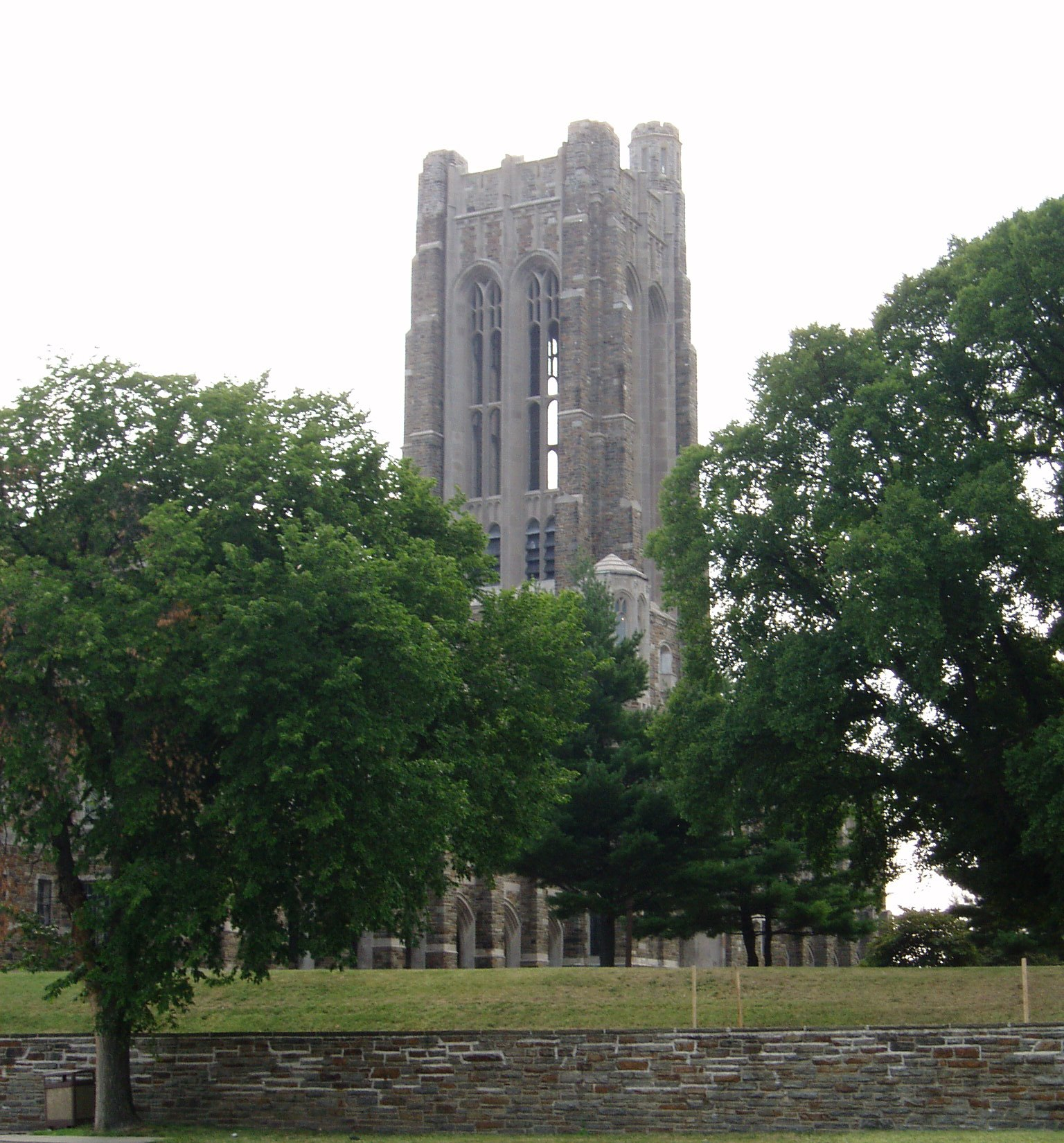
Opened to students and faculty in 1928, the Castle on the Hill has served as the centerpiece of the school's 38-acre campus.

In 1926, ground was broken at 33rd Street and The Alameda for a new Collegiate Gothic building. Designed by Buckler and Fenhagen (one a BCC alumnus), the structure cost nearly $3 million (equivalent to $44.4 million in 2025) and opened on April 10, 1928.

The building included carved gargoyles, stained glass windows, mahogany paneling, and two interior courtyards. Though expansions and a carillon were planned, they were never completed. The auditorium's stained glass ceiling was tarred over during World War II blackout requirements.

==== Integration and Modernization (1954–1970s) ====
In September 1954, BCC admitted its first Black students following Brown v. Board of Education. Two years later, the Maryland Scholastic Association integrated athletic competitions.

In 1970, Pierre H. Davis became the school's first Black principal. Enrollment declined and the advanced "A-Course" was discontinued in 1973.

==== Revival and Coeducation (1978–1990s) ====
In 1978, a half-million dollars was redirected to begin renovating the Castle. BCC relocated during renovations, and in 1979 admitted female students for the first time. Principal Solomon Lausch's leadership ushered in a revival of the school's academic prestige, culminating in a ceremonial rededication.

=== 2000s ===
==== Academic Renaissance and National Recognition (1990s–Present) ====
Under Principal Joseph Antenson and later Joseph Wilson, BCC implemented reforms, raised admissions standards, and gained autonomy from Baltimore City Public Schools. Wilson introduced the International Baccalaureate Diploma Program in 1998.

City College was named a National Blue Ribbon School during the 1999–2000 academic year by the U.S. Department of Education. Throughout the 21st century, City College has remained a staple in national rankings of the top high schools in the country. During the 2022–23 academic year, 460th out of over 20,000 public high schools nationally in the U.S. News and World Report annual rankings.

== Campus ==
On-campus memorial plaque honoring B.C.C. alumni who died in World War I.

Baltimore City College is located on a tree-shaded, 38 acres (150,000 m^{2}) hilltop campus at the intersection of 33rd Street and The Alameda in northeast Baltimore. The main academic building, commonly known as "The Castle on the Hill," was completed in 1928 in the Collegiate Gothic style and features a 150 ft (46 m) tower that is visible from much of the city. The campus also includes a separate powerhouse annex, constructed between 1926 and 1928, which originally housed electrical, mechanical, metal, printing, and wood shops.

In 1979, a new gymnasium was added to the southwest corner of the main building during a major renovation, replacing the original smaller gymnasium used from 1928 to 1977. The southern portion of campus includes George Petrides Stadium at Alumni Field, which serves as the home for football, track, and other athletic programs, along with facilities for baseball, soccer, and tennis.

In June 2003, the school's main building was added to the National Register of Historic Places and designated a Baltimore City Landmark in 2007, protecting its historic exterior from unapproved alterations. The school's Alumni Association received a preservation award from Baltimore Heritage for its efforts to maintain and protect the building's historic integrity.

In 2017, Architectural Digest named Baltimore City College the most beautiful public high school in Maryland and included it among the most beautiful in the United States.

In September, 2025, the entire Baltimore City College campus was closed and fenced-off from the public as a 3-year renovation to the main building was started. During the renovations, Baltimore City College students will be attending their classes at facilities offered by the University of Baltimore.

== Academics ==
=== 19th Century Curriculum and Early Institutional Identity ===
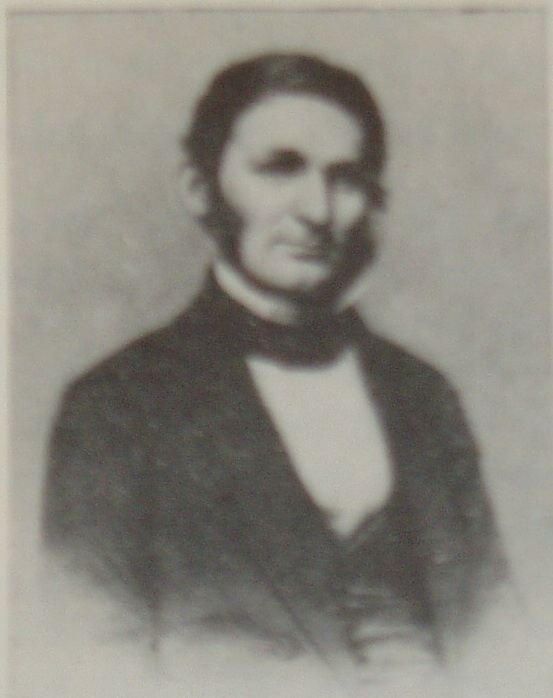
Professor Nathan C. Brooks (1809–1898), founding principal

The creation of a male high school "in which the higher branches of English and classical literature should be taught exclusively" was unanimously authorized by the Baltimore City Council on March 7, 1839. The school opened on October 20, 1839, with 46 students. Students were offered two academic tracks: a classical literature track and an English literature track. The sole instructor for both was educator and poet Nathan C. Brooks, who also served as principal.

To accommodate the two tracks, Brooks divided the school day into two sessions: one from 9 a.m. to 12 p.m., and the other from 2 p.m. to 5 p.m. The morning was dedicated to either classical or English studies, while the afternoon focused on English for all students. By the time Brooks resigned in 1849, the school had grown to include 232 students and seven additional instructors.

He was succeeded by Rev. Dr. Francis G. Waters, former president of Washington College. In 1850, under Waters' leadership, the City Council renamed the school "The Central High School of Baltimore" and granted authority to confer graduation certificates—a practice still in place today.

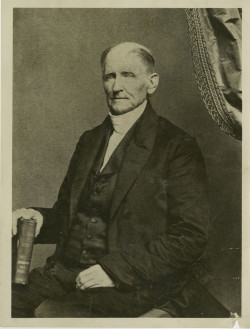
Professor Frances Waters (1792–1868), second principal

Waters reorganized the curriculum into eight 45-minute periods divided between morning and afternoon sessions. He also formalized seven academic departments: Belles-lettres and history, mathematics, natural sciences, moral, mental, and political science, ancient languages, and modern languages and music. Each was overseen by a separate instructor with the title of "professor".

In 1865, efforts began to elevate the school's status to that of a degree-granting college. In 1866, the institution was renamed "The Baltimore City College," its head was retitled from "principal" to "president," and the course of study was expanded from four to five years. However, the plan to confer Bachelor of Arts degrees was never realized, and the five-year curriculum was discontinued in 1869.

Despite this, Baltimore City College functioned as a hybrid between a public high school and what would later be termed a junior college. As higher education became more widely accessible at the end of the 19th century, the school shifted its emphasis toward preparing students for university-level study.

=== 20th Century Curriculum and Institutional Reform ===
In 1901, Baltimore City College reduced its five-year course of study to a four-year program. Students already enrolled under the previous curriculum were permitted to finish their studies. The new model maintained the school's academic rigor, allowing graduates to matriculate at Johns Hopkins University without examination. It introduced a credit-based system, permitting students to select courses totaling at least 150 credits for graduation.

From 1927 through the early 1990s, the curriculum was divided into two academic tracks: the "A" Course and the "B" Course. Both were college preparatory, but the A Course was more rigorous, often enabling students to enter university as sophomores. The B Course offered broader flexibility but did not carry the same advanced standing. In the early 1990s, Principal Joseph Antenson abolished the two-track system, citing concerns over its racially discriminatory implications.

==== The 1960s and 1970s ====
By the mid-20th century, the city's population was declining due to suburbanization, and the 37-year-old Castle building had seen little capital investment. These conditions led to a diminishing public perception of the school's prestige.

In response, administrators launched the "City Forever" strategic plan in 1965–66. The plan was supported by advocacy from the alumni association, student protests, and widespread public engagement via local media and school board meetings. Although the district pledged to reinvest in the school, few tangible improvements materialized over the following decade.

In 1975, faculty, students, and alumni—including then-Mayor William Donald Schaefer ’39 and City Comptroller Hyman Pressman ’33—renewed advocacy for reinvestment. The city subsequently committed to a $9 million renovation and a comprehensive two-year curriculum study.

A “New City College Task Force” composed of educators, alumni, parents, and scholars recommended a revitalized liberal arts and humanities-focused curriculum, increased autonomy in hiring, and stricter admissions standards.

While most recommendations were accepted by the school board in 1979, one was rejected: the continuation of all-male enrollment. The board opted for coeducation, aligning with trends at institutions such as Harvard University, Yale University, and Johns Hopkins University.

==== The 1990s ====
By 1990, Baltimore City College's enrollment and academic reputation had declined. The Middle States Association of Colleges and Schools raised concerns about the school's ability to provide rigorous instruction. In this context, the A Course was discontinued, and Principal Joseph Antenson implemented a standardized curriculum. He was removed in 1992, after which the district hired a private contractor to temporarily manage the school.

In 1994, Joseph M. Wilson—a lawyer and educator with degrees from Amherst College, University of Pennsylvania, University of Southern California, and Harvard University—was appointed principal. Wilson, supported by the alumni association and school community, secured increased funding and curricular autonomy. He introduced the International Baccalaureate Diploma Programme in 1998.

Wilson's tenure is widely credited with restoring academic excellence at City. Under his leadership, enrollment, graduation rates, and college placements improved significantly. In 2000, City College was named a National Blue Ribbon School by the U.S. Department of Education. In 2001, the Toronto National Post profiled City College in a feature story about exemplary international high schools.

=== 21st Century Curriculum ===
Being an International Baccalaureate World School has defined B.C.C.'s academic identity in the 21st century. All students participate in IB coursework, making it a schoolwide model rather than a selective track. The IB Middle Years Programme (MYP), implemented for all 9th and 10th grade students, emphasizes interdisciplinary connections, critical thinking, and intercultural understanding.

During their junior and senior years, students engage in the two-year IB Diploma Programme (DP), which requires study across six core academic areas. The curriculum includes extended research, oral presentation, and independent writing components, culminating in the IB Extended Essay and Theory of Knowledge course. B.C.C. offers approximately 30 advanced studies courses within the IB framework, many of which translate into college credit at institutions worldwide.

Although some alumni expressed concern about the exclusivity of the program when it was first introduced, the school proceeded with full expansion of the IB model. In addition to IB courses, the school continues to offer a limited number of Advanced Placement (AP) courses.

=== International Baccalaureate Program ===
Baltimore City College has offered the International Baccalaureate Diploma Programme since 1998, making it one of the earliest IB-authorized public high schools in Maryland. The program is accredited by the International Baccalaureate Organization (IBO), headquartered in Geneva, Switzerland.

The IBO promotes rigorous academic inquiry, intercultural understanding, and respect—developing students who strive to become knowledgeable, compassionate, and reflective global citizens. All City College students participate in the IB Middle Years Programme (MYP) in grades 9 and 10. In grades 11 and 12, students may pursue either the full IB Diploma or individual Diploma Programme (DP) courses for certificate credit.

==== IB Middle Years Programme (Grades 9–10) ====
All 9th and 10th grade students are enrolled in the IB Middle Years Programme. The MYP curriculum is interdisciplinary and globally focused, emphasizing both subject mastery and personal development through the IB Learner Profile and Approaches to Learning (ATL) skill framework.

Students study eight MYP subject areas, noted below. All 10th grade students complete the MYP Personal Project, an independent, year-long research and design task that reflects a topic of personal interest. Students are supported by a faculty adviser, the IB Coordinator, and the school librarian. Projects are assessed using official MYP rubrics, and additional guidance is available through the Writing Center and library.

MYP Subject Areas at Baltimore City College
MYP Subject Areas
Language and Literature	Language Acquisition	Individuals and Societies	Sciences	Mathematics	Arts	Physical and Health Education	Design (Grade 10 only)

==== IB Diploma Programme (Grades 11–12) ====
Students entering 11th grade may enroll in either the full IB Diploma pathway or choose 1–5 individual IB DP certificate courses. Full Diploma candidates must complete six DP courses—one from each subject group—along with the IB core requirements: Theory of Knowledge (TOK), the Extended Essay (EE), and Creativity, Activity, Service (CAS).

Requirements for enrollment in the DP:

- Completion of the MYP Personal Project
- Good academic standing (typically 4 or higher in most Grade 10 classes)
- Submission of a course request form through grade-level counseling

IB DP Courses Offered at Baltimore City College:

Baltimore City College IB Diploma Programme Course Offerings
IB Group	Subject Area	Course Options
Group 1	Studies in Language and Literature	English Literature SL / HL
Group 2	Language Acquisition	French SL / HL; Spanish SL / HL
Group 3	Individuals and Societies	History of Africa HL; Social and Cultural Anthropology SL / HL
Group 4	Sciences	Biology SL; Chemistry SL; Environmental Systems and Societies SL; Physics SL
Group 5	Mathematics	Mathematics: Analysis and Approaches; Mathematics: Applications and Interpretation
Group 6	The Arts	Film SL / HL; Music SL; Theatre SL / HL; Visual Arts SL / HL
Core Requirements		Theory of Knowledge (TOK); Extended Essay (EE); Creativity, Activity, Service (CAS)

=== Baltimore City College Certificate ===
Since 1851, B.C.C. has conferred the Baltimore City College Certificate upon students who successfully complete the school's prescribed curriculum. The requirements exceed the minimum graduation standards set by the Maryland State Department of Education. Students also receive the standard diploma conferred by the state.

Baltimore City College Diploma Graduation Requirements
Requirement	Description	Applies To
IB or AP Coursework	Completion of at least one IB DP/Certificate-level course or one AP course	All students
MYP Personal Project	Completion of the IB Middle Years Programme Personal Project	All students
Science	Enrollment in Physics or an advanced-level IB/AP science course	All students
Fine Arts	Two Fine Arts courses	All students (waived for full IB Diploma candidates)
College Writing	Completion of College Writing seminar	All students (waived for IB Diploma candidates and IB English IV students)
GPA	Minimum cumulative GPA of 70%	All students
College Applications	Submission of at least four college applications, including FAFSA	All students
Standardized Tests	Completion of SAT or ACT at least two times	All students
Service Learning	75 hours of documented Service Learning activity	All students

== Admissions ==
Admission to Baltimore City College is selective and open to residents of Baltimore City and surrounding counties in the metropolitan area. Non-Baltimore City residents may apply but are required to pay tuition. All applicants must meet the promotion requirements for ninth grade as defined by the Maryland State Department of Education.

Applicants must also earn a minimum composite score of 610, as calculated by Baltimore City Public Schools. In general, successful candidates have:

- A minimum 3.0 grade point average (or B letter grade / 80 percent) overall
- A 3.0 or better GPA in both mathematics and English
- Standardized test scores in the 65th percentile or above in math and English on the Maryland School Assessment (MSA)
- An attendance rate of 90 percent or higher

Due to the school's competitive admissions process, most admitted students exceed these minimum requirements.

== Enrollment ==
As of the 2023–2024 academic year, Baltimore City College enrolled 1,421 students in grades 9 through 12. Of those students, approximately 38% were male (540 students) and 62% were female (878 students).

The racial and ethnic composition of the student body was as follows:

- Black or African American: 942 students (66.3%)
- White: 215 students (15.1%)
- Hispanic or Latino: 198 students (13.9%)
- Two or More Races: 36 students (2.5%)
- Asian: 21 students (1.5%)
- Native Hawaiian or Pacific Islander: 4 students (0.3%)
- American Indian or Alaska Native: 2 students (0.1%)

Additionally, 652 students (45.9%) were eligible for free lunch under direct certification criteria.

=== Historic Enrollment Data ===
Baltimore City College Student Enrollment (1839–present)
1839:	46	1851:	287	1900:	600	1928:	2,500
1945:	1,422	1964:	3,880	1967:	3,088	1997:	1,279
2007:	1,353	2009:	1,319	2011:	1,315	2015:	1,309
2022:	1,494	2024:	1,421				

== Athletics ==
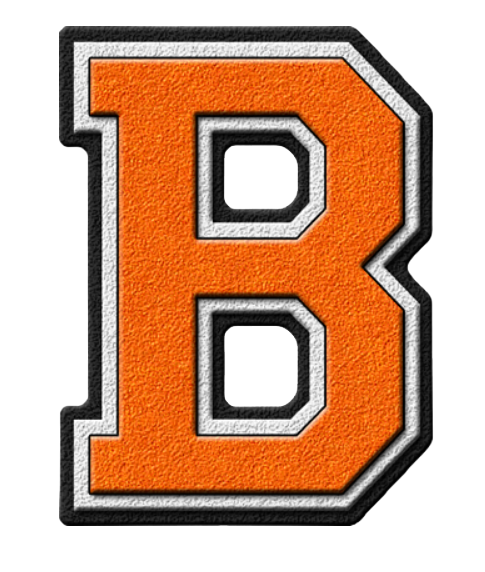
The Baltimore City College varsity athletics letter "B", orange with black trim

City College has a tradition of interscholastic athletics dating back over 120 years. While formal varsity teams were established in 1895, documentation of athletic activity at the school dates to the 1870s.

One of the school's traditions is its annual football rivalry with the Baltimore Polytechnic Institute, which began in 1889. According to oral history, the first matchup between the two schools took place in Baltimore's Clifton Park.By 1893, the football rivalry became an institutional fixture.

In the 1890s, City College competed in the Maryland Intercollegiate Football Association (MIFA), which included collegiate teams such as St. John's College, Swarthmore College, the United States Naval Academy, and the institution that would later become the University of Maryland, College Park. B.C.C. was the only high school in the league.

From 1894 to 1920, City College also fielded competitive lacrosse teams against programs at Johns Hopkins University and the United States Naval Academy, contributing to the early history of Maryland's state team sport.

In 1919, City College became a founding member of the Maryland Scholastic Association (MSA), a public-private high school athletic league led in part by B.C.C. professor and future principal Dr. Philip H. Edwards. The MSA governed interscholastic athletics in the region until its dissolution in 1993, when public schools—including Baltimore City College—withdrew and joined the Maryland Public Secondary Schools Athletic Association (MPSSAA). Today, the school's teams, known as the "Black Knights", compete in the MPSSAA Class 3A, North Region.

Baltimore City College currently offers 18 varsity sports. Boys' sports include baseball, basketball, football, lacrosse, soccer, and wrestling. Girls' sports include badminton, basketball, lacrosse, soccer, softball, and volleyball. Coeducational teams compete in cross country, indoor and outdoor track and field, swimming, and tennis. Girls' athletics were introduced in 1978 when City became coeducational after 139 years as an all-male institution.

=== Basketball ===
Basketball has been played at Baltimore City College for more than a century and a quarter dating back to the introduction of the new sport in America in the 1890s. One of the earliest recorded results in program history is a one-point overtime road loss to the future Maryland Terrapins (then known as the Maryland Agricultural College "Aggies" or "Cadets") on January 25, 1913. City College basketball competes in MPSSAA, Class 3A, Baltimore City (District 9) of the MPSSAA. The boys basketball program has won state championships in 2009, 2010, 2014, 2023, and 2025, while the girls program won a state championship in 2009.

=== Football ===
The Baltimore City College football program began in the mid-1870s, and has won more than 20 M.S.A. "A-Conference" and championships in its history. The Knights primarily competed against area colleges and universities throughout the 1880s and 1890s because only a few secondary schools existed at the time. The program began competing against other high schools at the beginning of the 20th century, especially after the 1919 organization of the old MSA and has held since 1941 the record for the longest streak of games played without a loss in MSA and MPSSAA history. The "Collegians" played 54 consecutive games without a loss between 1934 and 1941. Harry Lawrence, who guided the Castle footballers to a 38-game undefeated streak between 1936 and 1940 (including 35 wins, three ties, and four MSA championships), remains City College's most successful head football coach.

==== City–Poly rivalry (1889–present) ====
The City-Poly football rivalry is the oldest American football rivalry in Maryland, and one of the oldest public school football rivalries in the United States. The rivalry began in 1889, when the City College met the old Baltimore Manual Training School (later renamed the Baltimore Polytechnic Institute - "Poly" after 1893) at the old Johns Hopkins country estate for a football scrimmage in which City's freshman team beat the new B.M.T.S. team. City remained undefeated in the growing series according to the records until 1908. With B.C.C.'s 40–0 win in 2024, the Collegians now leads the series with a record of 66–63-6. The 2024 win over Polytechnic marked the program's 12th consecutive victory over their rival.

== Extracurricular activities ==
Baltimore City College offers more than 20 student clubs and organizations. These include chapters of national organizations such as the National Honor Society (established at the school in 1927) and Quill and Scroll. Service clubs include the Red Cross Club and Campus Improvement Association. Other activities include the Drama Club, which produces an annual play, the Art Club, Model UN, Band, Dance, and One City One Book, an organization that invites the entire school community to read one book selected by faculty and invites the author of the book for a reading, discussion, and question and answer period. In 2007, Pulitzer Prize winner, MacArthur Fellow, and novelist Edward P. Jones discussed his book Lost in the City. The school store is operated by students and managed by the Student Government Association. City's academic team participates on It's Academic, a local version of the syndicated nationwide television show, seen on WJZ-TV, (Channel 13), usually on Saturday mornings.

=== Speech and debate / literary and debating societies ===
Baltimore City College has one of the oldest and most decorated high school speech and debate programs in the United States, rooted in two historic student organizations: the Bancroft Literary Association (founded in 1876) and the Carrollton Literary Society (founded in 1878), later renamed the Carrollton-Wight Literary Society in honor of faculty advisor Charles Wight.

Together, these societies form the foundation of the school's modern competitive speech and debate program. The team regularly competes in a wide range of events including Policy Debate, Lincoln-Douglas Debate, Student Congress, Mock Trial, and interpretive speech.

Baltimore City College participates in four competitive leagues:

- Baltimore Catholic Forensic League (BCFL)
- Baltimore Urban Debate League (BUDL)
- Chesapeake Region of the National Catholic Forensic League (NCFL)
- National Speech and Debate Association (formerly the National Forensic League)

In recent years, the team has earned national recognition:

- In 2013, the team won the National Association for Urban Debate Leagues (NAUDL) Policy Debate National Championship.
- From 2010 to 2013, City College debaters earned multiple bids to the Tournament of Champions and advanced in final rounds at national invitationals.
- In 2024, seniors Nevaeh Sencion and Saidah Ervin won the NCFL Grand National Championship in Policy Debate, becoming the first African American women's team to do so in the tournament's history.

The program is supported by several community partners, including the Abell Foundation and the Baltimore Community Foundation, which established the Gilbert Sandler Fund for Speech and Debate in 2008.

=== Bands and Orchestras ===
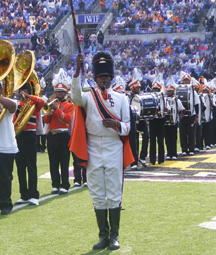
Baltimore City College Marching Knights' halftime show at M&T Bank Stadium in November 2007

Baltimore City College established its instrumental music program in the late 1940s. At the time, it included an orchestra, concert band, and marching band. The program gained prominence under Dr. Donald Norton, and in 1954, while he was on sabbatical, Professor Charles M. Stengstacke took over. During this period, the 65-member concert band also functioned as the marching band in the fall. Halftime performances often featured the band forming shapes like a heart or a car, ending with the formation of the letters C-I-T-Y.

In the 1980s, under Director James Russell Perkins, the ensembles expanded in both size and performance style. The marching band incorporated choreographed movements and traveled along the East Coast, earning superior ratings at district and state festivals. Perkins also founded the school's jazz ensemble, the "Knights of Jazz."

In 1994, Alvin T. Wallace became Band Director and oversaw the addition of a wind ensemble. Under his leadership, the marching band grew to over 150 members. In 1999, the program earned top honors at the high school band competition held at Disney World.

The program continued to earn recognition in the 2000s. In 2006, the wind ensemble received a superior rating at the district adjudication festival and the Marching Knights performed in the Baltimore Mayor's Christmas Day Parade.

=== Choirs ===
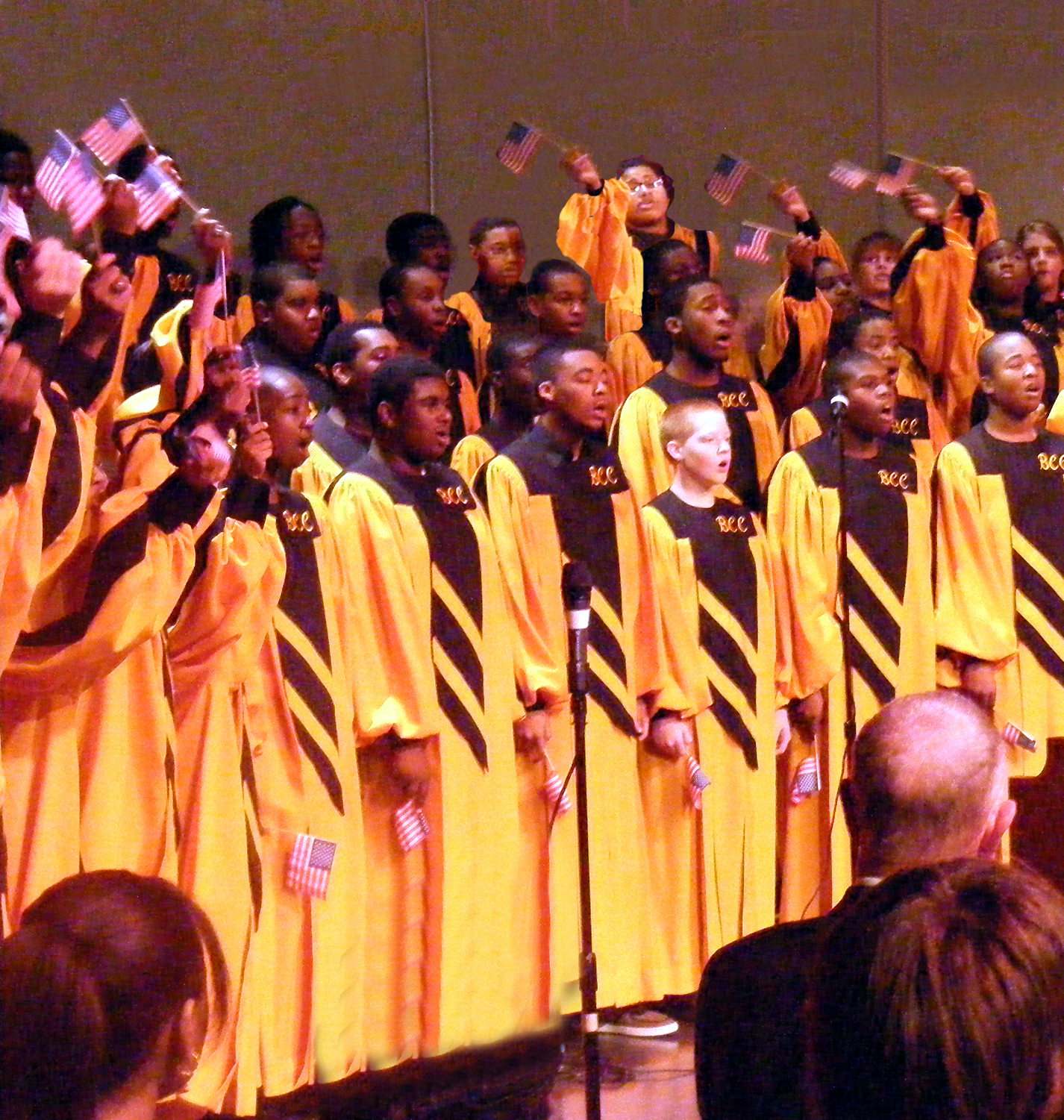
Baltimore City College's choir performing the "Battle Hymn of the Republic" at the school's 2006 Hall of Fame Assembly

The Baltimore City College choir was founded in 1950 by Professor Donald Regier. Originally a co-curricular subject with only 18 members, by 1954 it had developed into a major subject of study with 74 students enrolled. Under the direction of Linda Hall, today's choir consists of four groups: the Mixed Chorus, the Concert Choir, the Singin'/Swingin' Knights, and the Knights and Daze Show Choir.

The Mixed Choir is opened to all students at City College and currently has a membership of approximately 135 students. The Concert Choir is a more selective group consisting of about 50 students, who must audition for their places in the choir. The Singin'/Swingin' Knights is an even more selective group composed of 25 students. The Knights and Daze Show Choir is a group of students, who perform a choreographed dance routine while they sing. With the exception of the Knights and Daze Show Choir, which performs jazz and pop music, the choir's repertoire consists of gospel music, spirituals, and Classical works by composers such as Handel and Michael Praetorius.

External videos
- the choir sings at the 2024 Hall of Fame Ceremony, YouTube video

The choir has traveled to Europe on several occasions. Its first trip was in 1999, after receiving an invitation to perform at the Choralfest in Arezzo, Italy. In 2003, the choir returned to Italy to perform at the annual Conference of the Parties of the United Nations Framework Convention on Climate Change. The choir has also performed in France and Spain. On October 2, 2007, the Weill Institute of Music at Carnegie Hall announced that the City College choir was one of four high school choirs selected to participate in the National High School Choral Festival on March 10, 2008. The four choirs performed Johannes Brahms' A German Requiem under the direction of Craig Jessop, Mormon Tabernacle Choir Director. The choirs were led by their own directors in performing choral selections of their choosing.

== Student publications ==
=== The Green Bag ===
The Green Bag is the annual yearbook of Baltimore City College, first published in 1896. As of 2024, it has reached its 128th volume, making it one of the oldest continuously published high school or college yearbooks in the United States.

The name Green Bag was coined by G. Warfield Hobbs Jr., the 1896 senior class president and first editor-in-chief. It references the green "carpet bags" traditionally used to deliver lists of political appointments from the Governor of Maryland to the state legislature—a practice still referred to by journalists as the "green bag." According to the Maryland State Archives, the term has become associated with announcements of good news, echoing the celebratory nature of a graduating class receiving its yearbook.

Early editions featured faculty portraits, senior sketches, recollections, anecdotes, and quotations. In 1948, individual portraits of underclassmen were included for the first time. The yearbook introduced full-color photography in 1963, with later color editions in 1967, 1972, and, most notably, 2007, when the first all-color edition was published. For many decades, The Green Bag was printed by the local publisher H.G. Roebuck and Son, a company owned by a City College alumnus.

One of the most notable events in its history was the so-called "Green Bag Affair" of 1900. That year's edition included a cartoon depicting various faculty members as caged zoo animals—an act of satire that provoked strong objections from the Baltimore City Board of School Commissioners. Although the editors had already printed the volume, the Board attempted to censor it. The editorial staff refused to comply, leading to the withholding of diplomas for six editors and the business manager, and the cancellation of that year's public commencement ceremony. One of the censured students, Clarence Keating Bowie, would later serve on the same School Board in 1926. The controversial cartoon was reprinted in the 1972 edition (Volume 77) as part of a historical retrospective.

=== The Collegian ===
The Collegian has been the school student newspaper of record at Baltimore City College since it was first published as a bi-weekly newspaper in 1929. There have been other similar publications, such as The Oriole, the student magazine which started printing in 1912, however The Collegian is oldest, continuous student-run publication. Originally, the newspaper was both managed and printed by students. During the 1930s, The Collegian won numerous awards including second place in the Columbia Scholastic Press Association's annual contest for five years in a row. Since 2000, printing of the publication has been scaled back. The Collegian is now published quarterly, often with a bonus issue around the time of the annual City-Poly football game. Since 2014, The Collegian also actively engages students and alumni through various social media platforms.

== Alumni Association ==
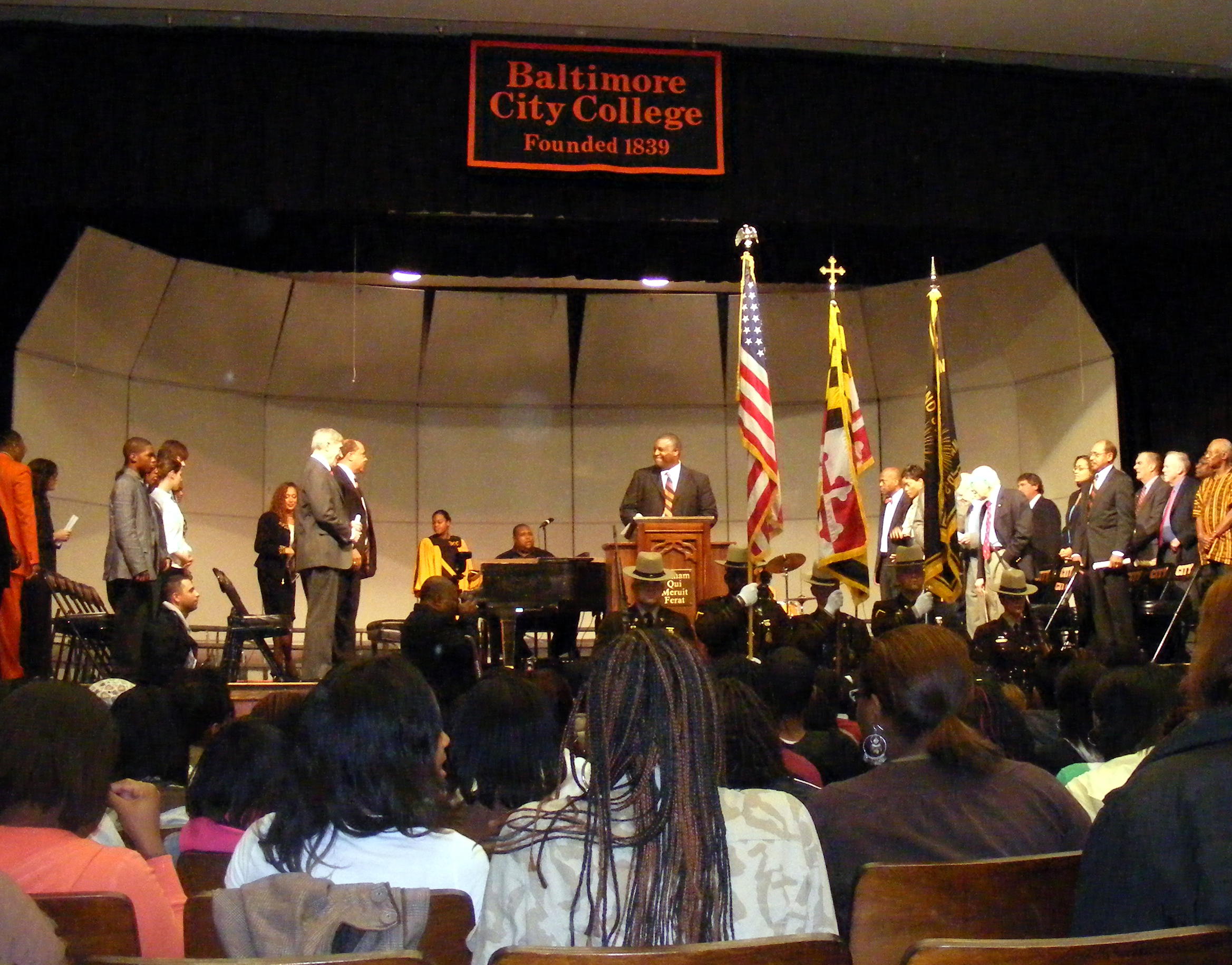
2007 Hall of Fame ceremony

The Baltimore City College Alumni Association, Inc. (BCCAA) was founded in 1866 to support the school's mission and foster alumni engagement. The association hosts an annual meeting each November and facilitates a variety of initiatives throughout the year.

The BCCAA manages alumni communications, maintains an alumni database, publishes a semi-annual newsletter, and assists with student enrichment and school improvement projects. It also oversees the Golden Apple Awards for faculty excellence, coordinates class reunion support, and sponsors the annual Hall of Fame induction ceremony.

=== Baltimore City College Hall of Fame ===
The Baltimore City College Hall of Fame honors alumni who have demonstrated outstanding service or achievement at the local, state, national, or international level. New inductees are recognized each October during a formal ceremony attended by alumni, students, faculty, and community members.

== Trustees of the Baltimore City College Scholarship Funds ==
The Trustees of the Baltimore City College Scholarship Funds, Inc. were incorporated in 1983, succeeding an earlier scholarship committee formed in 1924. The Trustees manage endowments that provide annual scholarships to graduating seniors, in accordance with donor-specified criteria. As of the most recent report, the combined endowment totals approximately $1.68 million and supports 34 named scholarships.

A bronze plaque located in the main hall of the school recognizes each of these permanent endowments with an individually cast nameplate.

== Baltimore City College Foundation ==
The Baltimore City College Foundation, Inc. (BCCF) is a nonprofit organization dedicated to supporting the long-term mission and sustainability of Baltimore City College. The Foundation provides financial support for capital improvements, academic enrichment, faculty development, and student initiatives.

Established to supplement the work of the Baltimore City College Alumni Association, the BCCF has funded several major projects, including:

- The renovation of the Center for Teaching and Learning
- Restoration of the school's historic Archives
- Upgrades to the cafeteria and common spaces
- The creation of the Gilbert Sandler Fund for Speech and Debate

The Foundation also manages targeted giving campaigns and endowments, and works closely with school leadership to identify strategic priorities. Its mission is guided by the motto "City Forever," and it plays a central role in ensuring that the school remains a top-tier academic institution.

== Notable alumni ==
Many City College alumni have become civil servants, including Congressman Dutch Ruppersberger, Senator Ben Cardin, and Maryland Governor William Donald Schaefer. Among graduates with significant military service are two Commandants of the U.S. Coast Guard – Rear Admiral Frederick C. Billard and Admiral J. William Kime, USMC Brigadier General Charles Henry Lauchheimer, as well as 2nd Lieutenant Jacob Beser of the United States Army Air Force the only individual to serve on both atomic bomb missions over Japan in 1945. In addition, four City College alumni are also recipients of the congressional Medal of Honor, the nation's highest military award.

== Notable faculty members ==
- George Young – Pro Football Hall of Fame inductee, longtime NFL executive, and general manager of the New York Giants; began his career as a teacher and football coach at City College.
- Ed Burns – Former social studies teacher at City; later co-creator and writer of HBO's The Wire and The Corner; recipient of the Edgar Award.
- ZZ Packer – Author of Drinking Coffee Elsewhere, Guggenheim Fellow, and contributor to The New Yorker; formerly taught at City College.
- George L. P. Radcliffe – U.S. Senator from Maryland (1935–1947) and former faculty member at Baltimore City College.
- Robert Herring Wright – Founding president of East Carolina University; early in his career, served on the City College faculty.
- McFadden Newell – Early faculty member at City; later became the first principal of Towson University.

== Principals ==
- Dr. Nathan C. Brooks (1839–1849)
- Rev. Dr. Francis G. Waters (1849–1853)
- John A. Getty (1853)
- George Morrison (1853–1857)
- Dr. Thomas D. Baird (1857–1873)
- William Elliott Jr. (1873–1890)
- Francis A. Soper (1890–1911)
- Dr. Wilbur F. Smith (1911–1926)
- Dr. Frank R. Blake^{†} (1926–1932)
- Dr. Philip H. Edwards^{†} (1932–1948)
- Chester H. Katenkamp^{†} (1948–1956)
- Henry T. Yost^{†} (1956–1963)
- Dr. Julius G. Hlubb^{†} (1963–1966)

- Dr. Jerome G. Denaburg^{†} (1966–1969)
- Dr. Pierre H. Davis (1970–1974)
- Maurice Wells^{†} (1974–1976)
- Isaiah E. White (1976–1977)
- Gordon Stills (1977–1978)
- Dr. Solomon Lausch (1978–1988)
- Jean Johnson (1988–1990), (1992–1994)
- Dr. Joseph Antenson (1990–1993)
- Joseph M. Wilson, J.D. (1994–2004)
- Dr. James Scofield^{†} (2005)
- Dr. Deborah L. Wortham (2005)
- Timothy Dawson (2006–2010)
- Ms. Cindy Harcum^{†} (2010–2026)
- Dr. Sedrick Smith^{†} (2026–present)

^{†} indicates principals who attended Baltimore City College
