= Bluford Drew Jemison STEM Academy West =

All-boy middle-high school in Baltimore, MD, USA

Location
- 1500 Harlem Avenue Street; Baltimore, Maryland 21217; United States; 39°17′49.66″N 76°38′27.87″W

Information
- School type: Public
- Founded: 2007
- Closed: 2024
- School district: Baltimore City Public Schools
- School number: 364
- Principal: LaWanda Wilson
- Grades: 6-12
- Gender: All-boys
- Enrollment: 232 (2018)
- Campus type: Urban
- Colors: Navy, Gold, White
- Team name: Rockets
- Website: City Schools Site

Bluford Drew Jemison STEM Academy West, was an all-boy public middle/high school located in Baltimore, Maryland, United States. The school's focus was on Science, technology, engineering, and mathematics education.

== History ==
The school was an extension of the Bluford Drew Jemison Math Science Technology Academy initially opened in 2007 as a charter middle school, and named for African Americans who had found success in STEM fields: Guion S. Bluford and Mae Jemison, and Charles R. Drew. This original school was located at 1130 N. Caroline St. in the Gay Street neighborhood of Baltimore. This original BDJ lost its Charter license in 2013 (becoming a traditional school) due to low academic performance and financial issues, before shuttering for good at the end of 2014.

Bluford Drew Jemison STEM Academy West was launched as a spin off in 2010. Initially co-located within the Diggs-Johnson Middle School at 1300 Herkimer St, the school moved to the former Walbrook High School at 2000 Edgewood Street in the Fairmont neighborhood in 2010 when Diggs-Johnson was closed to make room for the Southwest Baltimore Charter School. However, by November 2013, the school board had decided to empty the Walbrook campus entirely, and BDJ West was recommended for closure along with its predecessor. Community protests kept it from closure and relocation, but the board did revoke its charter in December of the same year, announcing it would look for a new operator.

In fall 2023, principal LaWanda Wilson proposed a merger with neighboring Augusta Fells Savage Institute of Visual Arts, the move was then approved by the Baltimore City Board of School Commissioners in January 2024.
