= Barkley Forum =

Intercollegiate debate and forensics organization

The Barkley Forum is the intercollegiate debate and forensics organization at Emory University. It is named after Emory alumnus and former United States Vice-President Alben W. Barkley. Debate at Emory began in the 1830s. The literary societies that practiced literary and forensic arts gave way to an intercollegiate debating society in the 1920s.

After World War II, the modern Barkley Forum was formed expanding the possibilities for more intercollegiate debate experience for students. While the Barkley Forum has experienced remarkable competitive success in the last two decades, the Forum has also remained committed to providing debate opportunities for those in under-served communities, both rural and urban.

The Emory National Debate Institute initially began in the 1960s to provide debate training for students from rural Georgia. That role expanded in the 1980s to provide opportunities for students from urban areas. The Barkley Forum began extensive outreach in the late 1980s establishing the first metro area Urban debate league. This effort, initially supported by grants from the National Forensic League and Phillips Petroleum, eventually expanded under grants from the Open Society Institute (OSI). The combination of OSI and the Barkley Forum made the growth of Urban debate leagues possible nationwide. From twenty students from various area public schools in the Atlanta area, the Urban Debate Leagues now exist in over fifteen major cities with thousands of participants each year.

Melissa Wade is the Executive Director of the Barkley Forum; William Newnam is the Associate Director. Edward Lee is the Director of Debate for the Barkley Forum.
