= Thomas D. Baird =

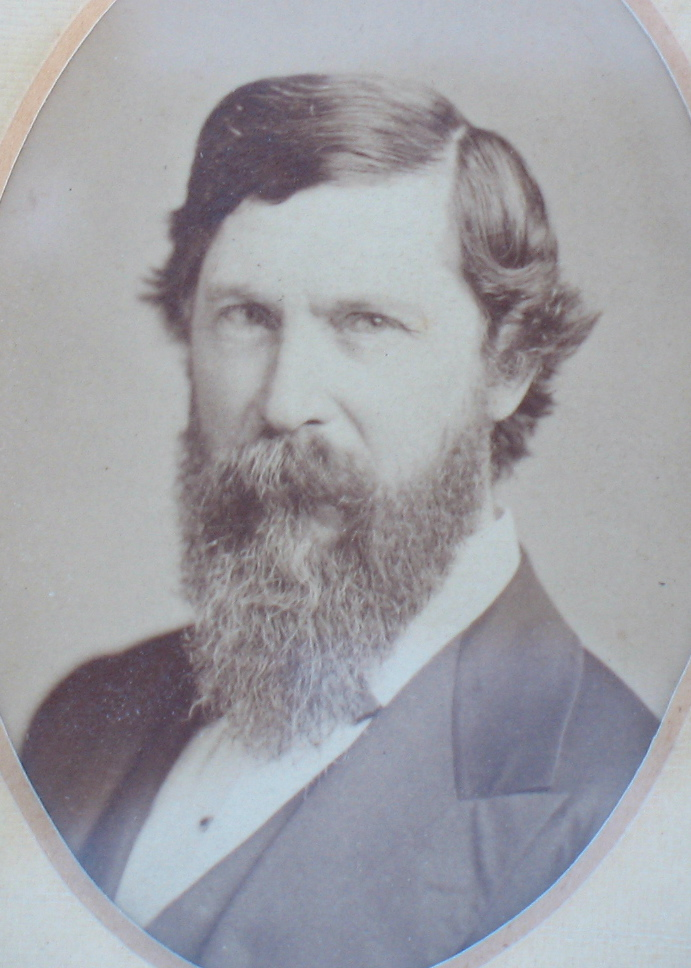
- Portrait of Baird, c. 1860
- Born: July 14, 1819; Newark, Ohio, U.S.
- Died: June 9, 1873 (aged 53); Baltimore, Maryland, U.S.
- Occupation: Educator

Thomas D. Baird (July 14, 1819 – June 9, 1873) was an educator born in Newark, Ohio, United States. Baird was the first professor of mathematics of Westminster College, and the fifth principal of Baltimore City College. He died in Baltimore, Maryland.

== Biography ==
Thomas D. Baird, the second son of the Presbyterian minister, Reverend Thomas D. Baird, was born on July 14, 1819, in Newark, Ohio. Baird was educated at Jefferson College in Pennsylvania, where he received both his Bachelor of Arts and Master of Arts.

In 1839, he began his career as an educator by teaching mathematics in Baltimore, Maryland. During this time, he also studied law and was admitted to the bar in 1844, although he was never a practicing lawyer. In 1847, Baird became a professor of mathematics at Marshall College in Mercersburg, Pennsylvania. He held this position for three years before deciding to open a private school in Baltimore, which was devoted to the study of classics and mathematics. Baird presided over the school for four years before he was elected professor of mathematics at Westminster College in Missouri. He remained in this position for three years before returning to Baltimore to serve as the fifth principal and professor of moral and mental philosophy at the Central High School of Baltimore—later renamed Baltimore City College, the third oldest public high school in the United States. Baird held this position until his death on June 9, 1873.

Baird received a Ph.D. from Concordia College, Missouri and an LL.D. from Centre College, Kentucky.

== Central High School of Baltimore ==
Under Baird's leadership, the school underwent a series of improvements aimed at strengthening the caliber of students admitted to the school and the quality of education. Baird increased the rigor of entrance examinations to the school as well as standards required for promotion to the next grade. This was evidenced in his first year as principal, when only about a third of the first year class was promoted to the second year. Baird also brought about changes in discipline at the school. He eliminated corporal punishment, and instead instituted a system in which a student's behavior was factored into his standing at the school.

In 1866, under the recommendation of Baird, a process was begun to elevate the high school to the status of a college. The school was renamed the Baltimore City College and a five-year course of study was created, in addition to the standard four-year course. Despite the change, the school was never elevated, and in 1869, Baird terminated the five-year course.

Academic offices
Preceded by George Morrison	Principal of Baltimore City College; 1857–1873	Succeeded by William Elliott Jr.
