= Nathan C. Brooks =

American academic (1809–1898)

Nathan Covington Brooks
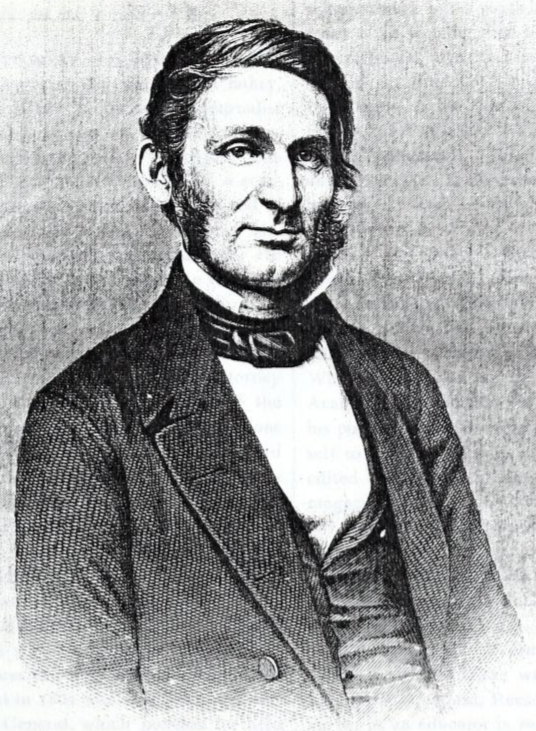
- Brooks in 1879 publication
- Born: August 12, 1809; West Nottingham, Cecil County, Maryland, U.S.
- Died: October 6, 1898 (aged 89); Philadelphia, Pennsylvania, U.S.
- Resting place: Green Mount Cemetery; Baltimore, Maryland, U.S.
- Education: St. John's College (MA)
- Occupations: Educator; historian; poet
- Spouses: Mary Elizabeth Gobright (m. 1826) Christiana Octavia Crump (m. 1867)
- Children: 11

Nathan Covington Brooks (August 12, 1809 – October 6, 1898) was an American educator, historian, and poet. Born in West Nottingham, Cecil County, Maryland, Brooks grew up to become the first principal of Baltimore City College, the third oldest public high school in the United States, and the only president of the Baltimore Female College, the first institution of higher education for women in Maryland. He also was the owner of the literary magazine The American Museum in which he published several works of the writer Edgar Allan Poe, and the author of several textbooks on classical literature. Brooks died in Philadelphia, Pennsylvania.

== Biography ==
Nathan Covington Brooks, the youngest son of John and Mary Brooks, was born in West Nottingham, Cecil County, Maryland on August 12, 1809. He began his education at the West Nottingham Academy, and upon graduating enrolled at St. John's College in Annapolis, Maryland. There he received a Master of Arts with his thesis consisting of a poem. After receiving his degree, Brooks began his teaching career at the age of 16 in Charlestown, Cecil County. He held this position for two years before opening a private school in Baltimore, Maryland in 1826, where he remained for five years. In 1831, he was elected principal of the Franklin Academy, located in Reisterstown, Maryland. After three years, Brooks resigned to become principal of the Brookeville Academy in Montgomery County, Maryland. However, in 1836, he resigned from the academy because the school was unable to pay his salary.

In 1839, Brooks was unanimously selected out of a pool of 45 candidates to be the first principal of the new male high school in Baltimore—later renamed the Baltimore City College. He served in this capacity until 1849, when he resigned to serve as the only president of the Baltimore Female College, the first institution of higher learning for women in Maryland. While at the Baltimore Female College, Brooks was granted an LL.D. from Emory College in Oxford, Georgia in 1859. He served as president of the Baltimore Female College until it was closed in 1890.

Brooks was married twice and fathered 11 children. He was wed to Mary Elizabeth Gobright on May 8, 1826, and later married Christiana Octavia Crump on June 26, 1867. Brooks died on October 6, 1898, in Philadelphia, Pennsylvania. He was buried in the family lot at Green Mount Cemetery in Baltimore.

== The American Museum ==
In 1838, Brooks purchased Summer Lincoln Fairfield's The North American Quarterly and moved the publication from Philadelphia to Baltimore. Brooks partnered with Dr. Joseph E. Snodgrass, a Baltimore physician, to transform the publication into The American Museum of Science, Literature and the Arts. The magazine mainly functioned as a literary publication, featuring literary criticism as well as poetry and short stories.

Brooks, who was a friend of the poet Edgar Allan Poe, published several of Poe's works in The American Museum. Poe's "Ligeia", "A Predicament" (published as "The Scythe of Time"), and "The Haunted Palace" were all originally published in Brooks' magazine. Nevertheless, the magazine was short lived. Only two volumes of the magazine were published and it ceased to exist after 1839.

== Literary works ==
Throughout his career as an educator, Brooks contributed poetry and prose writings to various literary magazines. Among the literary magazines that Brooks submitted works to, were Burton's Gentleman's Magazine, Graham's Magazine, the New York Mirror, and the Southern Literary Messenger. Brooks also wrote several anthologies of poetry, including Scriptural Anthology, which was published in 1837 and The Literary Amaranth, which was published in 1840. Poe wrote an ambivalent review of Brooks' Scriptural Anthology, which appeared in Graham's Magazine in December 1841. In his review, Poe wrote, "among many inferior compositions of length, there were several shorter pieces of great merit;—for example 'Shelley's Obsequies' and 'The Nicthanthes'." Poe was also critical of Brooks' comic works, while praising his more serious prose.

In addition to his poetry and prose, Brooks authored several textbooks, which focused mainly on classical literature, and a few popular history texts. These included First Lessons in Latin, published in 1845, First Lessons in Greek, published in 1846, A Complete History Of The Mexican War, published in 1849, and The History of the Church. Brooks also translated and published several editions of the works of Ovid, Caesar, and Virgil.

Academic offices
Preceded by New position	Principal of Baltimore City College; 1839–1849	Succeeded by Rev. Dr. Francis G. Waters
Preceded by New position	President of Baltimore Female College; 1849–1890	Succeeded by Position abolished after dissolution of college
