= Walbrook High School =

Defunct public school in Baltimore, Maryland US

Walbrook High School (Walbrook Campus)

Location
- 2000 Edgewood Street; Baltimore, Maryland 21216; United States; 39°18′37″N 76°40′36″W

Information
- School type: Public, Defunct, Comprehensive
- Motto: Where success is expected and failure is not an option.
- Founded: 1971
- Closed: 2006
- School district: Baltimore City Public Schools
- School number: 434 (Liberal Arts Academy); 435 (Institute of Business & Entrepreneurship); 436 (Homeland Security High)
- Grades: 9-12
- Enrollment: 1,920 (2006)
- Area: Urban
- Colors: Red, White, Gray
- Nickname: Warriors

Walbrook High School formerly known as Walbrook Senior High School (1971–1998) and Walbrook Uniform Services Academy (1999–2005), was a public high school located in Baltimore, Maryland, United States.

== History ==
=== Establishment ===
Walbrook was founded in 1971 as Walbrook Senior High School and has undergone numerous changes in its name and status over the past decade. Recent scandal has caused several structural changes to the school's administration and academic curriculum, including the separation of the school into different academies. In the early 1990s, the school was marred by reports of high drop out rates, average test scores, fires and fights. The school board organized a plan to revamp the school into a new learning environment, which included:

- Metal detectors
- Uniforms
- Academies (Business Academy, Criminal Justice Academy, Fire Academy)
- The renaming of the school to Walbrook High School Uniform Services Academy to reflect the new uniform policy.

The structure itself is a four-story all-brick square building with stairwells in all four corners. It has an open courtyard that is visible from all levels. In the courtyard are two all-metal sculptures, the turning point which was airlifted in and the question mark. The courtyard also includes an amphitheater. The interior of the school is a sharp contrast to the surrounding Walbrook Junction neighborhood.

=== Bundley era ===
In 1998, several news outlets in Baltimore were reporting the decline of the school and the system was opting for a new principal. It approached Andrey Bundley, due to his success at Greenspring Middle School. Under Bundley's direction, the school reported record numbers of attendance (95%) and an increase in state test scores. The school also saw the addition of several successful extracurricular activities and sports, including its nationally recognized debate team and basketball team.

In summer 2004, Bundley was accused of graduating almost 1/3 of Walbrook seniors in 2003 who did not meet Maryland state requirements. In the preceding school year, violence had increased and attendance and school performance had decreased. This led to Bundley's transfer to another school and an unsuccessful run for Mayor of Baltimore against Martin O'Malley. His transfer dismayed teachers and students, who unsuccessfully petitioned for his return. In October 2004, Shirley Cathorne became principal and oversaw the restructuring of Walbrook into smaller learning environments. However, Cathorne did not stay long due to family issues, and was replaced by Lamarge Wyatt.

The new administration phased out the school's old academies and curriculum and introduced new ones — the Homeland Security Academy, the Entrepreneurial High School, the Maritime Industries Academy and the Liberal Arts Academy — that were spread on different floors of the building, each with a different principal, uniform and teachers. The overall school and building is referred to as the "Walbrook Campus", since all of the schools share the same gym and cafeteria, but still refer to it as Walbrook High School.

Eventually, Walbrook was listed as a Title I school. Due to the failed efforts of getting the school under control, it was shut down. Two schools now operate in the building, Baltimore Civitas Middle/High School and Bluford Drew Jemison STEM Academy West.

== Debate team ==
In 2003, Walbrook's debate team was featured in a 60 Minutes segment to talk about the team and how their coach, Angelo Brooks, had inspired them to go to college. Along with the students at Walbrook, it helped the Baltimore Urban Debate League to gain national attention as well for the progress it had made in the Baltimore area.

In September 2006, Ofc. Angelo Brooks and Ofc. Eugene Fields Jr, teachers in the Criminal Justice Academy, sued the school system and the police department, saying they were victims of retaliation resulting in their removal and the disbanding of the debate team. The suit accused Maisha Washington, who was principal of the Homeland Security Academy, of "conspiracy ... to destroy the debate program." The text of the lawsuit also says Washington and Major Mary S. Young, who oversaw the officers, knowingly relayed to their supervisors false information about the job performance of the officers who sued. The defendants in the lawsuit include former mayor Martin O'Malley, Police Commissioner Leonard D. Hamm and former schools Chief Executive Officer Bonnie S. Copeland. In late 2006, Fields pulled out of the lawsuit, but the case in still pending in District Court with Brooks.

== Academies ==
=== #434 Liberal Arts Academy ===
434 Liberal Arts Academy is an academy located on the Walbrook High School campus. Established in 2006 it exclusively host students of zoned to Walbrook High School whose age is 16 and over. It is an alternative academy to separate them into one academy and focus directly on their specific educational needs. Their uniform colors are Yellow and Khaki or Maroon and Khaki. This school is located in the lower level of the Walbrook campus.

=== #435 Institute of Business & Entrepreneurship ===
435 Institute of Business & Entrepreneurship is an academy located on the second floor of the Walbrook High School campus. Its uniform colors are green and khaki. This school focuses on teaching its students the basics of business and entrepreneurship. Out of all three academies this one had the highest population of students. This academy was established in 2006 and is a part of the small school initiatives of baltimore city.

=== #436 Homeland Security High School ===
436 Homeland Security High School is an academy located on the third floor of the Walbrook High School campus. Its school is focused on Law and Public Policy. The uniform colors are blue and khaki. This school was established in 2006 along with the other academies that make up Walbrook High School.

== Notable alumni ==
- Devin Boyd – college basketball player who was the 1991 East Coast Conference Player of the Year
- Roscoe Smith (transferred after junior year) – professional basketball player; won the 2011 NCAA Division I national championship while playing for UConn
