= Severn Teackle Wallis =

American politician (1816–1894)

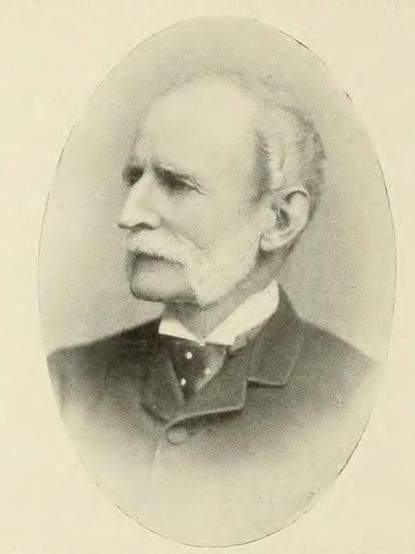
- Born: September 8, 1816; Baltimore
- Died: April 11, 1894 (aged 77); Baltimore
- Resting place: Green Mount Cemetery
- Alma mater: St. Mary's Seminary and University
- Occupation: Lawyer, politician
- Position held: member of the Maryland House of Delegates

Severn Teackle Wallis (September 8, 1816 – April 11, 1894) was an American lawyer and politician.

== Biography ==
Severn Teackle Wallis was born in Baltimore on September 8, 1816. He graduated from the secular St. Mary's College in northwest inner Baltimore in 1832, and later studied law with William Wirt, attorney general, and with noted lawyer John Glenn. At the age of 21, Wallis was admitted to the bar.

Wallis early developed a taste for literature and contributed to periodicals many articles of literary and historical criticism, also occasional verses. He became a proficient in Spanish literature and history and was elected a corresponding member of the Royal Academy of History of Madrid in 1843.

In 1846, he was chosen a fellow of the Royal Society of Northern Antiquaries of Copenhagen, in the Kingdom of Denmark. In 1847, he visited Spain and in 1849 the U. S. Government sent him on a special mission to that country to examine the title to the public lands in their former colony of East Florida (on the peninsula), as affected by royal Spanish Crown grants during the negotiations for the treaty of 1819, which provided for the American annexation of Florida, and creation of the Territory of Florida.

In 1851, he was a speaker at the first commencement exercises held for the newly renamed Central High School of Baltimore, now Baltimore City College. Wallis maintained a frequent and constant interest in the premier local public school and in the public schools system as a whole.

From 1859 until 1861, Wallis contributed largely to the editorial columns of the local newspaper, the Baltimore "Exchange", and wrote for other journals as well.

He was a Whig until the organization of the Know-Nothing party, after which when it disorganized, he was a Democrat.

In April 1861, Wallis was elected to the lower House of Delegates of Maryland in the General Assembly of Maryland, and took an active part in the special proceedings of the Maryland Legislature, called into special session that Spring by Governor Thomas H. Hicks, as the authority of the Governor of Maryland at Frederick instead of the state capital at Annapolis which was then occupied by Massachusetts and New York militia under the command of Gen. Benjamin F. Butler, deciding on the issue of secession and the state's relationship to the pending crisis and the forming war policies of President Abraham Lincoln. He was chairman of the committee on Federal relations, and made himself obnoxious to the Federal authorities by his reports, which were adopted by the Legislature, and which took strong ground against the possibilities of Civil War, as well as against the then prevailing "doctrine of military necessity".

In September 12 of that year, four months after Butler's occupation of the state's major city, Wallis was arrested with nine other secessionist members of the Maryland Legislature and imprisoned for more than fourteen months in Fort McHenry, Fort Lafayette, and Fort Warren. He was finally released by November 1862.

He then returned to the private practice of the law in Baltimore. In 1870, on the death of his friend John Pendleton Kennedy, Wallis was elected provost of the University of Maryland at Baltimore.

In December 1872, as chairman of the art committee of private citizens appointed by the Maryland Legislature, he delivered the address upon the unveiling in Annapolis of sculptor William Henry Rinehart's statue of Chief Justice Roger Brooke Taney of the United States Supreme Court.

Wallis died on April 11, 1894, aged 77, at his home in Baltimore. He was buried in Green Mount Cemetery.

== Legacy ==
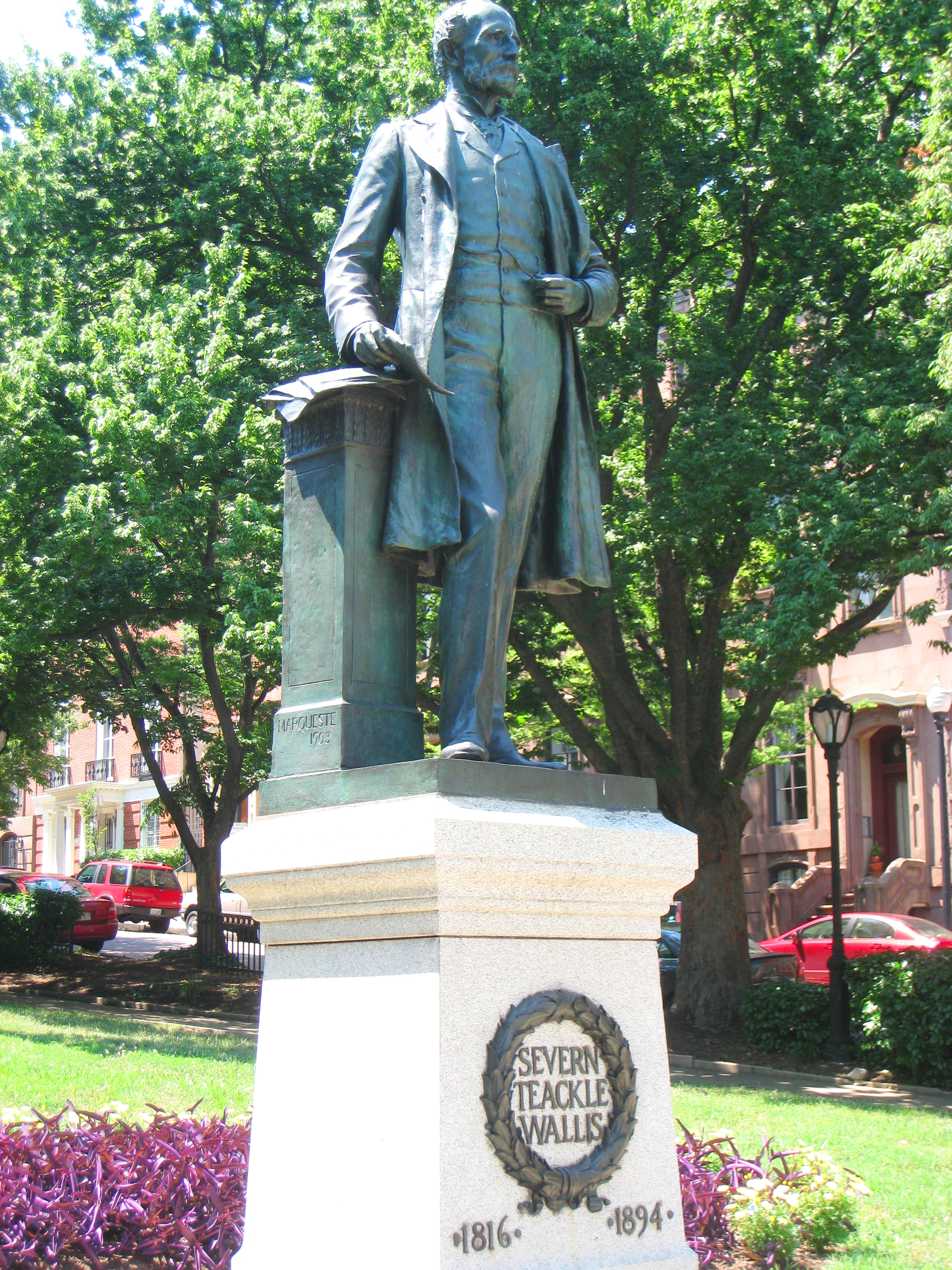
Statue of Wallis in Baltimore

A bronze statue of Wallis in his likeness, was erected to his memory and stands east of the Washington Monument in East Mount Vernon Place in the park square sloping downhill to the east facing St. Paul Street along East Monument Street in Baltimore, Maryland, on a pedestal with his name and birth-death years. A bust of Wallis stands outside the ceremonial courtroom of the Mitchell Courthouse in the Circuit Court for Baltimore City.

One of his colleagues imprisoned with him in the 1860s, Henry Mactier Warfield, named his fifth son Teackle Wallis Warfield. He in turn in 1896 named his daughter Bessie Wallis Warfield. She later became world famous as Wallis Simpson, wife of former king Edward VIII, the Duke of Windsor.

== Published works ==
Wallis contributed to many periodicals and numerous pamphlets on legal and literary subjects. Wallis also published:

- Glimpses of Spain (1849) LCCN 04-5097
- Spain: Her Institutions, Politics, and Public Men (1853) LCCN 04-5098
- Discourse on the Life and Character of George Peabody (1870) LCCN 06-24682
- The Guerillas: A Southern War Song. Composed in 1862 by Wallis during the time he was imprisoned in the "Yankee Bastille" which was located at the Narrows of New York Harbor and held Confederate prisoners during the Civil War.
