= National Association for Urban Debate Leagues =

- Abbreviation: NAUDL
- Headquarters: Chicago

The National Association for Urban Debate Leagues (NAUDL) is a Chicago-based non-profit organization that prepares low income students of color to succeed in college and in their future careers by organizing and supporting competitive debate teams in urban public schools across the country. The NAUDL engages in advocacy and fundraising on behalf of Urban Debate Leagues (UDLs), which operate at 500 high schools and middle schools in 19 cities across the U.S., including Atlanta, Baltimore, Chicago, Dallas, D.C., New York, and Los Angeles. Debate is believed to improve critical thinking skills and educational outcomes.

A map of core Urban Debate Network cities, expansion cities, and prospective sites for new UDLs.

== Special Events ==
=== Urban Debate National Championship ===
Established in 2008, this tournament features 84 of the nation’s top UDL debaters squaring off in a major U.S. city every April. Debaters compete in regional tournaments for the right to advance to the National Championship. Shagun Kukreja and Amna Tariq from University High School of Humanities in Newark, New Jersey won the 2011 Championship on a 3-0 decision.

=== NAUDL Annual Dinner ===
This event is held to "celebrate the growth of urban debate and its life-changing impact on students nationwide." It takes place every April, and precedes the start of the National Championship. The event is attended by former debaters and supporters.

== See also ==
- Competitive debate in the United States
