= Urban debate league =

Group of high school policy debate teams

An urban debate league (UDL) is a group of high school policy debate teams from urban high schools in the United States. UDLs are generally located in large cities throughout the United States and work predominantly with minority students.

== History ==
=== Early years ===
There were various initiatives surrounding debate in urban areas in the early 1980s in Atlanta, Detroit, and Philadelphia.

The 1960s saw a rapid expansion of interscholastic forensics - competitive speech and debate. Rapid growth by the National Forensic League and the forensic community as a whole was matched by a growing number of metropolitan leagues intended to increase tournament opportunities in areas where a number of speech and debate programs existed. The Philadelphia Senior High School Debate League was started in the School District in the mid-1960s. By 1965, a large Metro Forensic League which included speech, theater, and debate competition developed in Nashville, Tennessee. Many of those programs simply merged into the overall forensics community, but some continued to flourish as specialized, localized communities. By the early 1980s, approximately 30 Philadelphia teams were meeting once a week after school at Olney High School doing Policy Debate. The league became the Philadelphia Scholastic Debate League in 2007 with the support of the After School Activities Partnerships (ASAP) and switched to Public Forum debate in 2008.

In the 1980s, the face of high school debate began to change. A growing awareness of the unequal access to debate spurred some individuals to focus on the need to expand access to disadvantaged groups in urban areas. Traditionally left out by financial constraints, many inner-city school students were completely excluded. The Detroit Public Debate League began in 1984 as an after-school partnership between the Detroit Gifted and Talented Program and Wayne State University Director of Debate George Ziegelmueller. While developed as a "gifted" program, it was open to all Detroit communities and brought many socio-economically disadvantaged students into the activity. In Atlanta, the Urban Debate League was born as a graduate school research paper in 1983 that explored the hypothesis that debate might be a tool to level the playing field in education, and that words might be used to reduce violence in America's cities. The initial Atlanta UDL was formed as a partnership between the Barkley Forum of Emory University and the Atlanta Public Schools. The concept took root and flourished, and by 1985, it was a fully established league.

Early program support for urban debate initiatives was granted through the National Forensic League and Phillips Petroleum by the early 1990s. Significant seed funding was then provided by the Open Society Institute (OSI) in the Spring of 1997 to take the initiative national, and OSI chose the Atlanta Urban Debate League model as the template to model in other cities. As a result, Atlanta has traditionally been thought to be the basis for the urban debate network. By 2010, more than 40,000 urban public school students had competed in UDL tournaments, coming from over 400 high schools. The once predominantly white, suburban activity has changed to more accurately reflect American society. And the tireless efforts of the National Association for Urban Debate Leagues, the Associated Leaders of Urban Debate, and the National Debate Project continue to promote, support, and assess this important educational reform movement.

=== The Open Society Institute and New Leagues ===
The most crucial component in making the Urban Debate League a national education reform movement was seed funding from George Soros’ Open Society Institute. In the spring of 1997, OSI launched its High School Debate Grantmaking Program, the purpose of which was to support initiatives that seek to institutionalize competitive debate opportunities in high schools in traditionally underserved communities. OSI already had a tradition of supporting high school debate through its network of foundations in Eastern Europe and the former Soviet Union, where OSI had demonstrated that participation in debate fostered the skills that empower young people to actively participate as citizens of open society.

After the successful establishment at a successful Urban Debate League in New York City based on the Atlanta model, OSI continued its support for the Atlanta and New York City leagues. By 2000, OSI had provided seed and support funding for leagues in Detroit, Tuscaloosa, Chicago, St. Louis, Kansas City, the San Francisco Bay area, Baltimore, Providence, and Southern California. Before ending the program, they had provided funding for the establishment of UDLs, adding Los Angeles, and Newark. All of those leagues are still operating in 2010, and continue to serve students and provide educational opportunities that would otherwise not exist. That continued operation shows that the OSI initiative has been a great success in creating a program that would be able to gain public and private support in order to continue even when the initial OSI grants ended.

The contributions of OSI and other funders has led multiple other donors to bring to fruition Urban Debate Leagues in their own cities. For instance, Friends of the Miami Dade Urban Debate League—a group of individuals, corporations, and foundations—established an Urban Debate League in Miami in 2005. In 2006, a league formed in Boston. Since that time, it has received support from The Boston Public Schools, the Boston Foundation, The Carl and Ruth Shapiro Family Foundation, Social Venture Partners, Edvestors, The Mentor Network, The Harbus Foundation, the GMA Foundation, and the A.C. Ratshesky Foundation. Also, the Einhorn Charitable Trust provided funding to found a UDL in Milwaukee in 2006. As of October 2008, the Milwaukee program is no longer administered through or associated with Marquette University. In 2007, the Dallas Urban Debate Alliance brought debate to the Dallas Independent School District. In 2008, a group of former high school and college debaters founded the Houston Urban Debate League to bring debate to at risk students in Houston. The Houston Independent School Board partnered with that group to support the start up of a 15 school league for the 2008–2009 school year. Also in 2008, a former parochial high school debater with the assistance of the NAUDL formed the Memphis Urban Debate League Advisory Board and partnered with Memphis City Schools to establish a 15 school league for the 2008–2009 school year (www.memphisdebate.org). The Community Education Initiative is leading an effort to establish a new UDL in Nashville for the 2010–2011 school year. The league being formed represents a collaboration between the Community Education Initiative, the Metro Nashville Public Schools, the Metro Forensic League, the National Association for Urban Debate Leagues, and the National Debate Project. All over the country, funders, universities, and individuals who are called to make a difference in their communities are partnering to bring the benefits of debate to disenfranchised youth.

in 2015, a new Urban Debate League was formed in Washington D.C. (WUDL) to further expand the network.

=== UDLs today ===
With the growth of Urban Debate Leagues across the country, there are several national entities that are committed to reaching as many students as possible with the power of debate. In 2002 the National Association for Urban Debate Leagues was created to provide national leadership of the Urban Debate Network.

The National Debate Project (NDP)—a consortium of Emory University, Georgia State University, Tennessee State University, Clark Atlanta University, and New York University—works in the field of education reform, and promotes debate as a tool for empowering urban and rural youth living in America's most socio-economically challenged communities. In 2003 urban debate moved into national prominence with an article in U.S. News & World Report and a feature story on 60 Minutes about the Baltimore Urban Debate League. The sudden attention and the reduction of OSI support led to the formation of the National Debate Project in Atlanta and domestic activities by the International Debate Education Association (IDEA). At about this time Urban Debate Leagues began to develop their connections with the growing after-school programs movement: in 2004 and 2005 the NAUDL was invited to make presentations at the National Institute for Out of School Time and the Alliance for Excellent Education annual conferences.

In 2005, the Associated Leaders of Urban Debate (ALOUD) was formed, led by New York University (NYU) President John Sexton and Pitney Bowes CEO Michael Critelli.

Major press coverage of the Urban Debate League movement and NDP projects has been featured in the New York Times, U.S. News & World Report, Seattle Times, Chicago Tribune, Baltimore Sun, Atlanta Journal-Constitution, Teacher Magazine, Chronicle for Higher Education, Christian Science Monitor, the White House official website, and on CBS' 60 Minutes.

== Funding ==
The goal of the OSI's Urban Debate Program was to offer initial support to fund debate programs within urban communities, develop local stakeholders (e.g., university partners, community funders and school system support) and then to exit the equation. The concept was once local actors see the value of the program, sustaining investment in debate would become easier. Today, Urban Debate Leagues are funded primarily by one of three local institutions: urban public school systems, non-profit organizations dedicated to establishing a local UDL, or university debate programs engaged in community outreach.

== How it works ==
Most UDLs function in their own unique way, and use different teaching methods to familiarize urban students with the format and application of policy debate. Most urban debate leagues recruit and train urban educators as coaches, though many also use university debaters or former debaters within the community to serve as assistant coaches. While all UDLs attempt to recruit volunteer support (e.g., tournament judges, tournament tab room coordinators, and lecturers at debate workshops for students), certain core costs of a UDL must be funded in order for the program to be sustainable including coach stipends, debate materials, and transportation to tournaments.

Local debate programs have spawned other methods to integrate debate into their communities. Urban debate has expanded to include debate across the curriculum (as a classroom learning tool), public debates (partnering with community-based organizations), debates in prisons, and middle school competitions.

UDLs have demonstrated a very high level of cost-effectiveness, averaging less than $650 per student for a year's involvement in a program that researchers and media observers have widely recognized as unusually intensive in its academic focus, relative to other after-school programs.
