= Pennsylvania High School Speech League =

PHSSL Logo

The Pennsylvania High School Speech League (PHSSL) is a high school forensics league within the state of Pennsylvania. The PHSSL state championship takes place yearly in March at Bloomsburg University.

== History of PHSSL ==
PHSSL was founded in 1961, by Dr. Robert E. Dunham, to promote speaking throughout the entire state of Pennsylvania at Penn State University. The state championship took place at Susquehanna University from 1992 through 2016, and since 2017, the state championship takes place at Bloomsburg University.

== Publications ==
The Pennsylvania High School Speech League publishes its own newsletter which is titled "The Communicator". PHSSL uses "The Communicator" to put forth information regarding leadership in the organization, plans, and records of student performance in the state championship.

== Leaders ==
The Pennsylvania High School Speech League chooses the officers in the organization based on their merit and dedication to promoting forensics. The election of officers is a democratic process. As of June 2023, the current leaders include:

- Executive Director
  - Sharon Volpe - North Allegheny Senior High School
- Site Director
  - Dr. Harry C. "Neil" Strine IV - Bloomsburg University
- Secretary
  - Jodi Fetterolf - Bloomsburg University
- Board Members
  - Dr. Leslie Rogne Schumacher - Harvard University
  - Bob Hall - Fairview High School
  - Lisa Bompiani-Smith - Greater Latrobe High School
  - David R. Long - Southern Lehigh High School
  - Jess Cerchiaro - Our Lady of the Sacred Heart High School
  - Ellen Boyer - Shikellamy High School
  - Holly Smith - Penn Cambria High School
  - Hugh P. Ringer - Mercer Area High School
  - Aditya Dhere - Pine-Richland High School
  - Beth Young - North Catholic High School
  - Ben Edwards - Upper St. Clair High School
  - Tiffany Dacheux - Dallastown Area High School
  - Chris Berdnik - Pennsbury High School
- District Chairs
  - District 1 - Hugh P. Ringer Mercer Area High School & Bob Hall Fairview High School
  - District 2 - Beth Young North Catholic High School
  - District 3 - Ben Edwards Upper St. Clair High School
  - District 4 - Lisa Bompiani-Smith Greater Latrobe High School
  - District 5 - Cassie Thomas Windber Area High School
  - District 6 - Paige Stonge West Shore Christian Academy
  - District 7 - Tiffany Dacheux Dallastown Area High School
  - District 8 - Jessica Niemiec Holy Redeemer High School & David Long Southern Lehigh High School
  - District 9 - Ellen Boyer Shikellamy High School
  - District 10 - Bonnie Perry Harriton High School
  - District 11 - Cory Shay Gwynedd Mercy Academy
  - District 12 - Chris Berdnik Pennsbury High School
  - District 14 - Holly Smith Penn Cambria High School
  - District 15 - Ashley Murphy Unionville High School
  - District 16 - Paul Beer Pittsburgh Central Catholic High School

== Hall of Fame ==
PHSSL has created a hall of fame for great participants, coaches, and supporters of forensics. The Pennsylvania High School Speech League's hall of fame came into existence in 1986, and has inducted at least one member ever since.

== Elected Members of PHSSL Hall of Fame ==
- 2019 RITA YUNKER, Bishop Canevin High School
- 2018 CORY CLARK SHAY, Gwynedd Mercy Academy
- 2017 CAROL LESHOCK, Greensburg-Saleme High School
- 2017 KALE FITHIAN, McDowell High School
- 2015 KATHY HEWSTON, Hempfield Area Senior High School, Greensburg
- 2014 KATHRYN GINGERICH, Red Land High School, Lewisberry
- 2014 STEPHEN MEDOFF, Pennsbury High School, Fairless Fields
- 2013 CHRISTINE METCALFE, Mechanicsburg High School, Mechanicsburg
- 2013 JOHN V. ROCHE, Nazareth Academy High School, Philadelphia
- 2012 TIM WAXENFELTER, Quigley Catholic High School, Baden
- 2011 KEITH BROSIOUS, Elk Lake High School, Dimock
- 2010 DAVID LONG, Southern Lehigh High School, Center Valley
- 2010 SANDRA W. SAXMAN, Secretary, Pennsylvania HS Speech League, Selinsgrove
- 2010 LARRY D. AUGUSTINE, Director, Pennsylvania HS Speech League, Selinsgrove
- 2009 SHARON VOLPE, North Allegheny High School, Wexford
- 2010 ROBERTA RINGER, Mercer Area High School, Mercer
- 2007 VICKY TRIMMER, Mechanicsburg Area High School, Mechanicsburg
- 2007 MARSHA K. WILLIAMS, Greensburg-Salem High School, Greensburg
- 2006 ELLEN BOYER, Shikellamy High School, Sunbury
- 2005 MARY FURLONG, Delone Catholic, McSherrystown (RETIRED)
- 2004 ROBERT CASEY, Trinity High School, Camp Hill
- 2003 CARL W. ASKEW, Shikellamy High School, Sunbury
- 2002 REV. RAYMOND HAHN, Cathedral Preparatory, Erie
- 2002 KATHLEEN O'HALLORAN, Norwin High School, North Huntingdon
- 2001 MARIA CARUSI, Gwynedd Mercy Academy (Posthumously)
- 2001 ALICE URSIN, Bethel Park High School, Bethel Park
- 2000 SALLY FINLEY, Belle Vernon High School, Belle Vernon
- 2000 JAMES WILLIG, (Posthumously), Lancaster Catholic, Lancaster
- 1999 NO AWARD GIVEN
- 1998 WILLIAM MURRAY, Mechanicsburg High School, Mechanicsburg
- 1998 ANTHONY STOKES, The Kiski School, Saltsburg
- 1997 ROYCE RICE, North Hills High School, Pittsburgh
- 1997 HUGH RINGER, Mercer Area High School, Mercer
- 1996 JOHN BUETTLER, Holy Ghost Preparatory, Bensalem
- 1996 JANET DICENZO, Kennedy-Kennrick Catholic, Plymouth Meeting
- 1996 ANTHONY FIGLIOLA, Holy Ghost Preparatory, Bensalem
- 1995 W. MICHAEL NAILOR, Danville High School
- 1995 MARY ANN YOSKEY-BERTY, Trinity High School
- 1995 BETH YOUNG, North Catholic High School
- 1994 RALPH KARN, Keystone Oaks High School, Pittsburgh
- 1994 JANET ROBB, McKeesport Area High School, McKeesport
- 1993 MARGARET EMELSON, Uniontown High School, Uniontown
- 1992 GLENN CAVANAUGH, Derry Area High School, Derry
- 1992 CARL GRECCO, Truman High School, Levittown
- 1992 GLORIA WASILEWSKI, Riverside High School, Ellwood City
- 1991 THOMAS FARR, Shikellamy/Danville High School(s)
- 1990 MARILYN ENGLEHART, Central Cambria High School
- 1990 FATHER TOM MEULEMANS, Archmere Academy
- 1989 EDWIN KELLY, Pennsbury High School
- 1989 CALLISTUS W. MILAN, Retired
- 1988 HOWARD FEDRICK, Retired
- 1988 PEGGY ANN MADDEN, North Hills High School
- 1987 THELMA CARUSO, Charleroi High School
- 1987 ELEANOR LANGAN, Scranton Central High School
- 1986 ROBERT E. DUNHAM, Vice President of Academic Services, PSU
- 1986 JEANNE M. LUTZ, Director, Pennsylvania High School Speech League
- 1986 BERYL MCCLAIN, Retired
- 1986 SISTER ST. IRMINUS, Retired
- 1986 BROTHER RENE STERNER, Principal, Calvert Hall College

== PHSSL Events ==
PHSSL features many events at the state tournament. To qualify, there is a bidding system where excellent performance at local tournaments can earn a student a bid. If a student receives three or more bids, then they automatically qualify. Alternatively, there are also district tournament qualifiers where students can qualify for the state tournament directly. A list of events from the PHSSL Website:

Drama: Competition in drama is held at the regional and state levels. A school performs a one-act play or cutting of a longer work with more than two characters. Two schools advance from each region to the state finals. Competitions are held during the first semester.

Policy Debate: A clash of two, two-person teams, one affirmative and one negative, on the annual national policy resolution. The affirmative presents a case for change in the present system. The negative supports the present system or a counter-proposal for change.

Public Forum Debate: A clash of two 2-person teams, one pro and one con on a contemporary resolution. National topics change every month.

Lincoln-Douglas Debate: A clash of two debaters, one affirmative and one negative, on a values topic.

Parliamentary Debate: A clash of two 3-person teams, one for the resolution and one against the resolution. Rounds can be either on a prepared topic or an impromptu topic chosen 30 minutes before the start of the round. Topics are chosen by the Executive Board for the District and State Tournaments.

Oral Interpretation of Poetry: A contestant interprets with script in hand one or more poems. Time limit: 10 minutes.

Oral Interpretation of Prose: A contestant interprets with script in hand a cutting from a short story or novel. Time limit: 10 minutes.

Dramatic Interpretation: A contestant chooses a cutting from a serious play and memorizes it. The student recreates the scene using appropriate gestures and voices. Time limit: 10 minutes.

Humorous Interpretation: A contestant chooses a cutting from a humorous play and memorizes it. The student recreates the scene using appropriate gestures and voices. Time limit: 10 minutes.

Informative Speaking: Original speeches teach or explain a concept or idea. Time limit: 7 minutes.

Extemporaneous Speaking: A contestant is provided three current events topic on politics, economics, or culture to choose from and selects one. Preparation time: 30 minutes. Time limit: 7 minutes.

Persuasive Speaking: Original speeches convince the audience. Time limit: 10 minutes.

Extemporaneous Commentary: A continuation of both extemporaneous and persuasive speaking. It can be both informative and advocative. Knowledge of events and some history is required. Contestants seated at a table or desk for the presentation. Preparation time: 30 minutes. Time limit: 7 minutes.

Duo Interpretation of Literature: “Literature” is defined as a single stage, screen, television, radio play, fictional or non-fictional work or poem. All selections must be published or commercially available in print, audio, or video form. Time limit: 10 minutes.

Impromptu Speaking: In a limited amount of time a student prepares a brief speech on topics such as proverbs, aphorisms or quotations. Preparation time: 5 minutes. Time limit: 5 minutes.

Student Congress (Senate): In this event students take on the roles of legislators. Using parliamentary procedure, students debate bills and resolutions on current issues.

In addition, competition in the following events are held at the state level only:

News Broadcasting: A pair of contestants present a two-minute news broadcast. In subsequent rounds, prepared scripts are used.

Student Congress (House): The event is the same as Senate, however different legislation is used, and each school is limited to only one entry for House.

== Results: Overall Team State Championship ==
- 2019 - Upper St. Clair High School
- 2018 - North Allegheny High School
- 2017 - Upper St. Clair High School
- 2016 - Holy Ghost Preparatory
- 2015 - North Allegheny High School
- 2014 - North Allegheny High School
- 2013 - Holy Ghost Preparatory
- 2012 - Danville High School
- 2011 - McDowell High School
- 2010 - Holy Ghost Preparatory
- 2009 - Holy Ghost Preparatory
- 2008 - Holy Ghost Preparatory
- 2007 - Holy Ghost Preparatory
- 2006 - Mount Lebanon High School
- 2005 - Holy Ghost Preparatory
- 2004 - Holy Ghost Preparatory
- 2003 - Holy Ghost Preparatory
- 2002 - Holy Ghost Preparatory
- 2001 - Scranton High School
- 2000 - Holy Ghost Preparatory
- 1999 - Holy Ghost Preparatory
- 1998 - Holy Ghost Preparatory
- 1997 - Holy Ghost Preparatory
- 1996 - Holy Ghost Preparatory
- 1995 - Holy Ghost Preparatory
- 1994 - Scranton High School
- 1993 - Scranton High School
- 1992 - Scranton High School
- 1991 - Scranton Central High School
- 1990 - Scranton Central High School
- 1989 - Scranton Central High School
- 1988 - Scranton Central High School
- 1987 - Scranton Central High School
- 1986 - Scranton Central High School
- 1985 - Scranton Central High School
- 1984 - LaSalle College High School
- 1983 - Scranton Central High School
- 1982 - Holy Ghost Preparatory
- 1981 - Holy Ghost Preparatory
- 1980 - Shikellamy High School
- 1979 - Shikellamy High School
- 1978 - Pennsbury High School
- 1977 - Central District Catholic High
- 1976 - Scranton Central High School
- 1975 - Central District Catholic High
- 1974 - Central District Catholic High
- 1973 - Pennsbury High School
- 1972 - Pennsbury High School
- 1971 - Central District Catholic High
- 1970 - Scranton Central High School
- 1969 - Central District Catholic High
- 1968 - Scranton Central High School
- 1967 - Central District Catholic High
- 1966 - Central District Catholic High
- 1965 - Central District Catholic High
- 1964 - Cathedral Preparatory School

== See also ==
- Competitive debate in the United States
- National Speech and Debate Association
- National Catholic Forensic League
- National Forensic League
