= American Forensic Association National Speech Tournament =

Speech tournament

The American Forensic Association National Speech Tournament (AFA-NST) is an intercollegiate, individual events-based forensics tournament held in conjunction with the first Saturday in April, beginning on the prior Friday and continuing through the subsequent Monday. In comparison to National Forensic Association Championship Tournament, another prominent college-level individual events national tournament, the AFA-NST has significantly more stringent qualification procedures and a smaller, but more exclusive field of competition. The AFA-NST represents the culmination of the forensics season for many collegiate speech teams.

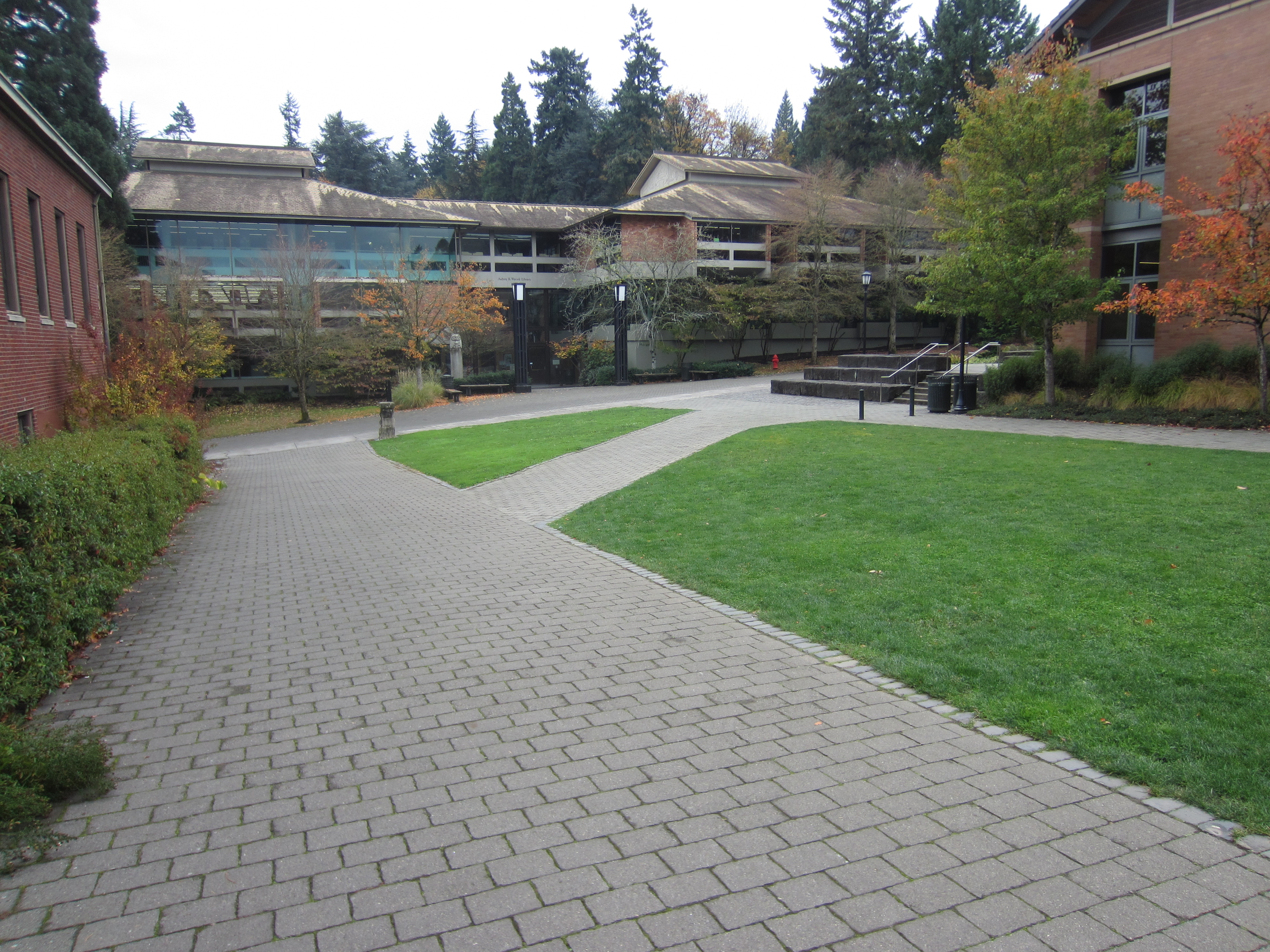
Lewis and Clark College - Host of the 2026 AFA-NST

The 2026 AFA-NST took place at Lewis and Clark College during April 3–6, 2026.

== History ==
Formed in 1949, the American Forensic Association was created with the goal of teaching students to utilize the skills of argumentation and advocacy. In the first decades of its existence, the AFA was primarily focused on promoting debate competitions, with little to no interest in individual events.

As a result in the rapid rise of interest in individual events in the late 1960s, Dr. Seth Hawkins of Southern Connecticut State University, Dr. Raymond Beaty of Ohio University and Dr. Jack Howe of California State University, Long Beach began to propose ideas of an organized national tournament focused on individual events. Dr. Beaty reported that his proposals were disregarded by the debate community. During the 1970-71 forensics season, Dr. Hawkins made the decision that, despite the lack of support from the debate community, the increased interest in IEs (individual events) justified the establishment of a national championship tournament. This tournament was held on the campus of Ohio Northern University, 23 schools participated, and the annual IE tournament that would eventually become known as NFA Nationals was established.

Realizing that the NFA's new IE national tournament could perpetuate the already existing split within the community regarding the competitive validity of IEs, the AFA began working towards a solution in 1972. Jerry Anderson, the president of the AFA at the time, began calling meetings to address measures that could be taken to incorporate IEs into the AFA's agenda. Anderson proposed a change to the AFA's constitution to allow for the inclusion of IEs; this change was ratified in 1973. Anderson, along with E.R. Tame, the Chair of the Educational Policies Committee, proposed that the AFA enact institutional changes to accommodate IEs. In 1973, the AFA voted to establish the AFA Committee on Individual Events. In the three years following its establishment, the Committee worked towards developing an inceptive procedural standard for the AFA-NST. This effort was bolstered in 1976, as James Weaver assumed the presidency of the AFA. Weaver proved a staunch advocate of the NST's establishment. Within the first year of taking office, Weaver established the National Individual Events Tournament Committee, and appointed Larry Schnoor of Minnesota State University, Mankato as Chair. Shortly thereafter, Schnoor and the committee began making preparatory arrangements for the inaugural AFA-NST.

In April 1978 the inaugural AFA-NST was hosted by Illinois State University. 58 schools attended the 1978 AFA-NST.

- Eastern Michigan University won the team sweepstakes championship at the 1978 AFA-NST
- Meg Langford of George Mason University won the individual sweepstakes championship at the 1978 AFA-NST
- Six schools who attended the 1978 AFA-NST have never been absent from any subsequent AFA-NST through 2013:
1. Bethel College (Kansas)
2. Bradley University
3. George Mason University
4. Kansas State University
5. Minnesota State University, Mankato
6. University of Wisconsin-Eau Claire

The tournament was known as the AFA-NIET (American Forensics Associational National Individual Events Tournament) prior to a name change in 2019.

== Previous AFA-NSTs ==
=== List of sweepstakes champions ===
Team and individual sweepstakes awards are awarded to the best overall performing team and individual at each AFA-NST, respectively.

Team sweepstakes awards are given to the teams with the highest aggregate total of sweepstakes points earned by the team's individual competitors. At the AFA-NST, team sweepstakes points are awarded as follows:

- Preliminary rounds: .5 points for each 3rd place ballot, 1 points for each 2nd, 1.5 points for each 1st. (only the school's top 3 competitors in each event earn points for preliminary rounds)
- Out-rounds (quarterfinals, semifinals, finals): 1 point for 6th place, 2 points for 5th place, 3 points for 4th place, 4 points for 3rd place, 5 points for 2nd place, 6 points for 1st place.

When tabulating individual sweepstakes, only the individual competitor's ranks and placings are used, and points awarded for preliminary ballot ranks are doubled. Otherwise, individual sweepstakes are tabulated identically to team sweepstakes.

Year	Individual champion	Team champion
1978	Meg Langford, George Mason University	Eastern Michigan University
1979	Meg Langford, George Mason University	George Mason University
1980	Kim Norris, Iowa State University	Bradley University
1981	Sean Patrick O'Rourke, Humboldt State University	Bradley University (2)
1982	Laura Gordon, Clarion University of Pennsylvania	Bradley University (3)
1983	Patrick Page, Whitman College	Bradley University (4)
1984	Patrick Page, Whitman College	Bradley University (5)
1985	Greg Dolph, Bradley University	Bradley University (6)
1986	Greg Dolph, Bradley University	Bradley University (7)
1987	Tom Doyle, Bradley University	Bradley University (8)
1988	Ken Klawitter, Bradley University	Bradley University (9)
1989	Cam Jones, Cornell University	Bradley University (10)
1990	Peter Tagg, Southern Utah University	Bradley University (11)
1991	Karon Bowers, Bradley University	Bradley University (12)
1992	Karon Bowers, Bradley University	Bradley University (13)
1993	Tim Schultz, Kansas State University	Bradley University (14)
1994	Tim Schultz, Kansas State University	University of Texas at Austin
1995	August Benassi, Bradley University	University of Texas at Austin (2)
1996	August Benassi, Bradley University	Bradley University (15)
1997	Matthew Whitley, University of Texas at Austin	Bradley University (16)
1998	Nance Riffe, George Mason University	Bradley University (17)
1999	Rajni Shankar, George Mason University	Bradley University (18)
2000	Chris McLemore, Kansas State University	Bradley University (19)
2001	Steve Zammit, Cornell University	University of Texas at Austin (3)
2002	Bonny McDonald, University of Texas at Austin	University of Texas at Austin (4)
2003	Zenobia Harris, West Texas A&M University	Western Kentucky University
2004	Courtney Anderson, George Mason University	Western Kentucky University (2)
2005	Ryan Hubbell, Arizona State University	Illinois State University
2006	Natalie Sintek, Western Kentucky University	Western Kentucky University (3)
2007	Lydia Nelson, Western Kentucky University	Western Kentucky University (4)
2008	Jessy Ohl, Kansas State University	Western Kentucky University (5)
2009	Merry Regan, University of Texas at Austin	Western Kentucky University (6)
2010	Amanda Voirol, Bradley University	Bradley University (20)
2011	Quincey Smith, George Mason University	Western Kentucky University (7)
2012	Jacoby Cochran, Bradley University	Bradley University (21)
2013	Jacoby Cochran, Bradley University	Bradley University (22)
2014	Nick Gilyard, Western Kentucky University	Western Kentucky University (8)
2015	Farrah Bara, University of Texas at Austin	Western Kentucky University (9)
2016	Farrah Bara, University of Texas at Austin	University of Texas at Austin (5)
2017	Nathan Leys, George Mason University	University of Texas at Austin (6)
2018	Andrea Ambam, Western Kentucky University	University of Texas at Austin (7)
2019	Andrea Ambam, Western Kentucky University	Western Kentucky University (10)
2021	Anna Kutbay, University of Alabama	Western Kentucky University (11)
2022	Anna Kutbay, University of Alabama	University of Texas at Austin (8)
2023	Terrence Mayfield, Illinois State University	University of Texas at Austin (9)
2024	Fernando Cereceres, University of Texas at Austin	University of Texas at Austin (10)
2025	Rodrigo Trujillo, Bradley University	University of Texas at Austin (11)
2026	Aaron Anderson, Tennessee State University	University of Texas at Austin (12)

Due to COVID-19, the 2020 tournament was cancelled, resulting in no sweepstakes winners.

== Events ==
There are 11 events that are sanctioned by the AFA and held at the AFA-NIET. All events fall into one of three categories:

- Interpretation
- Public Address
- Limited Preparation

=== Interpretation events ===
There are five AFA-sponsored events which fall into the interpretation category. Interpretation events involve the performer selecting and cutting a script (usually from a play, book, or movie), and acting out the scenes. All AFA interpretation events require the performer to hold a 'black book' that contains their manuscript. This book can be used as the competitor sees fit, meaning it may be used as a prop, but the use of other objects as props is prohibited. All interpretation events have a 10-minute time limit.

- Poetry interpretation

Poetry interpretation involves the performance of a selected cutting of poetry with significant literary merit. The performance may be one poem, or a combination of multiple pieces (often referred to as a 'program'). Play cuttings are prohibited from use. The focus of this performance should be on the development of language.

- Prose interpretation

Prose interpretation features the performance of a prose piece of significant literary merit. The performance may feature only one work, or it may be a program. Play cuttings and poetry pieces are prohibited from use. The focus of this performance should be on development of the narrative.

- Drama interpretation

Under the AFA rules of Drama Interpretation, the performer is to create a cutting from either stage, screen, or radio with significant literary merit. The performance may feature only one play, or it may be a program. The performer may portray multiple characters. The focus of this performance should be on the development of characterization.

- Program oral interpretation

Program oral interpretation is an event that is unique to the AFA-NST and is not sanctioned by NFA nationals. In POI, the performer is to create a program of selections linked by a common theme, and consisting of at least two of the different genres of forensics interpretation literature (prose, poetry, and drama), with the pieces being of significant literary merit. Each genre must be represented by a unique piece of literature; one piece may not represent multiple genres. One selection may be original. The focus of this event should be on the development of the theme through the established narrative.

- Dramatic Duo

Dramatic Duo is the only AFA-sponsored event to feature two competitors in the performance. The performance may feature cuttings from any genre of literature; the cutting may be only one piece, or it may be a program. The selected cutting can be either humorous, serious, or a combination of the two. The performers are not allowed to directly look at each other or touch each other. The performers may each portray multiple characters if they so choose.

=== Public address events ===
There are four AFA-sponsored events that fall into the category of public address. Public address events involve the performance of an originally written speech covering a specific topic or issue. Audio and visual aids are permitted for use in all public address events. Performers are heavily encouraged to integrate multiple sources into their speech. All events in this category have a 10-minute time limit.

- Persuasive speaking

Persuasive speaking involves the performer delivering an original speech that is intended to inspire action or change the beliefs of the audience. Minimal notes are permitted, but heavily discouraged. Visual aids are permitted, but not mandatory. Judging should be based on the performer's public speaking skills and the effectiveness of the message.

- Informative speaking

In informative speaking the performer delivers an original, factual speech that is intended to inform and educate the audience about a unique subject. Minimal notes are permitted, but heavily discouraged.

- Communication analysis

Known as 'rhetorical criticism' at NFA nationals, communication analysis is an original speech centered on the evaluation of a communication event, often referred to as the 'artifact' (speeches, movements, advertisements, etc.). The evaluation should utilize rhetorical principles and theories. Manuscripts are permitted, but heavily discouraged.

- After-dinner speaking

After-dinner speaking is an original, humorous speech centered on a single theme or subject. While the speech should be mostly humorous, it should not resemble a stand-up comedy act. Judging should be based on speaking skill, speech coherence, and good taste in humor. Minimal notes are permitted, but heavily discouraged.

=== Limited preparation events ===
There are two limited preparation events sponsored by the AFA. Limited preparation events are unique from other forensics events in that the speech is written 'on the spot' with a limited amount of time allocated to preparation. Both events are performed as speeches. Limited notes are commonly used in these events. Audio and visual aids may not be used. All limited preparation events have a 7-minute time limit.

- Extemporaneous speaking

In extemporaneous speaking, competitors receive three topics covering a range of current events. The competitor will select one of the three topics, and is then given 30 minutes to prepare an original speech utilizing multiple sources. Due to its preparation time, extemporaneous speaking is the only AFA-sponsored event where competitors speak in a previously assigned order which is generally not flexible or subject to change. Limited notes may be used.

- Impromptu speaking

In impromptu speaking, the competitor receives a quotation to use as the topic of their speech. The competitor's 7-minute time limit starts at their reading of the quotation. The speech may be humorous, serious, or a combination of both, but should stay relevant to the quotation and the speaker's interpretation of it. Limited notes are permitted.

== Qualification ==
There are two ways that a competitor can qualify an event for the AFA-NST:

=== At-large qualification ===
For an event to be qualified through the at-large process, the competitor must obtain two 'legs' (placings) in the event at two separate regional tournaments that total to 5 or less (e.g. 3rd, 2nd; 4th, 1st; 2nd, 1st; 1st, 1st). A leg can be acquired at any tournament in which at least 7 schools are participating.

Placings will only count as a leg if the requirement for number of competitors in the event is met:

- 1st: 2-3
- 2nd: 4-5
- 3rd: 6-7
- 4th: 8+

=== District qualification ===
Events may also be qualified for the AFA-NST by placing 3rd or higher in that event at their school's respective district qualifying tournaments.

All AFA member schools are placed into a district. District placement is largely (but not entirely) based on the state that the school is located in:

- District 1: California, Nevada, Hawaii
- District 2: Oregon, Washington, Idaho, Montana, Alaska
- District 3: Oklahoma, Kansas, Texas, Missouri, Louisiana, Arkansas
- District 4: North Dakota, South Dakota, Minnesota, Wisconsin, Iowa, Nebraska
- District 5: Illinois, Indiana, Michigan, Ohio
- District 6: Georgia, Tennessee, Florida, Alabama, North Carolina, South Carolina, Mississippi, Kentucky
- District 7: Virginia, Maryland, New Jersey, Delaware, Pennsylvania, West Virginia, District of Columbia, Massachusetts, Rhode Island, New York, Staten Island, N.Y., Connecticut, Maine, New Hampshire, Vermont
- District 8: [dis-established due to lack of schools; merged into District 7]
- District 9: Utah, Wyoming, Colorado, New Mexico, Arizona, Texas (El Paso)

Note: Schools may enter a petitioning process if they wish to be placed in a different district.

Each AFA-NST district holds two district qualifying tournaments each academic year, one in the Fall semester and one in the Spring semester. The respective district committees determine when the district qualifying tournaments will be, specifically, but Fall district qualifying tournaments must take place after October 1st and no later than December 15th, and Spring district qualifying tournaments must take place after January 15 and before the third weekend of March. Events that have already been qualified through the at-large process are ineligible for competition at the district qualifying tournaments. A student qualifies an event for the AFA-NST when they place among the top 3 competitors of that event. If an individual has two legs coming into the district qualifier and finishes at a placing sufficient for their second leg, then that event is qualified at-large, and everyone who placed below said individual is moved up one spot, allowing them to potentially qualify.
