= Interstate Oratorical Association =

Public speaking competition

- Founded: 1874
- Type: Intercollegiate
- Purpose: Speech Organization
- Location: Knox College, Galesburg, Illinois
- Key people: F. I. Moulton; Henry W. Read; Geo A. Lawrence; Larry A. Schnoor
- Website: interstateoratoryassociation.org

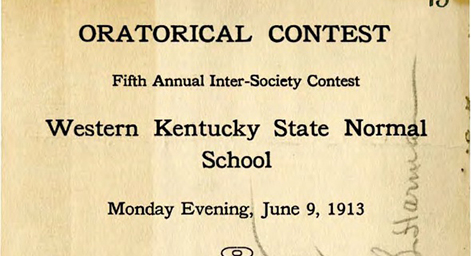
The Interstate Oratory Association is the oldest public speaking organization within the United States. Founded in 1874, the IOA has held a contest for the top persuasive speakers represented from each state. Here, the 1913 IOA contest was hosted by Western Kentucky University in Bowling Green, Kentucky on June 9, 1913.

The Interstate Oratory Association is an intercollegiate contest in oratory or persuasive speaking. Founded in 1874, the IOA is the oldest public speaking organization in the United States and has held contests for the top oratory or persuasive speakers from each state ever since. The annual Interstate Oratory Contest is usually held within the last weekend of April with two representatives from state competing at the event. The 2026 IOA contest was hosted at the University of Florida on April 24–26.

The IOA is composed of approximately twenty state collegiate forensic organizations. The organization's purpose is to conduct an annual competition in Oratory. Participants in the contest are the top two finalists in each of the respective state contests. In this sense, the state competitors represent the member state's oratory participants.

== History ==
On November 4, 1873, representatives of the Adelphi Society of Knox College sent a letter to several colleges proposing an intercollegiate contest in oratory. Favorable replies were received from the Illinois State Industrial University, Monmouth College, Chicago University, Iowa State University, Iowa College and Beloit College.

The first Interstate contest was held on February 22, 1874, in Knox College at Galesburg, Illinois. Students from Wisconsin, Iowa, and the host state were the first entrants. Judges considered excellence of thought, style, and delivery; the person receiving the highest rating was awarded first place and $100. At the meeting held in Chicago on June 9, 1874, a permanent organization was formed with representatives from Wisconsin, Illinois, Ohio, Indiana, and Michigan present. An annual contest has been held every year since then.

Between 1874 and 1936, there was a single division of the contest with each orator representing a state. However, in 1936, the IOA committee decided to two divisions, one for men and one for women. This practice continued until 1973 when the Association decided to revert to its original format of a single division with each state represented by the top two orators selected at their state championship tournament.

Contest winners were awarded monetary gifts until 1953, when the IOA voted to give medals and certificates instead. Today, plaques are awarded to the semi-finalists and finalists in the contest.

The site of the IOA annual contest rotated among member states, and for a time period, they were held for a number of years at the University of Chicago and then later at Wayne State University in Detroit. In 1984, the Association voted to consider site location based on the merits of the bids presented.

Several earlier books published speeches of the winners of the IOA contest throughout the early years of the Association. Between 1908 and the early 1930s, each college was responsible for publishing its winning speeches, but in 1934, the IOA took over the task and has since continued to publish all of the orations presented in Winning Orations. Many contestants that have participated in the contest have gone on to establish themselves in a number of professions, including law, education, religion, theatre, television, politics, and public speaking.

== See also ==
- American Forensic Association National Individual Events Tournament
- American Forensic Association
- National Forensic Association
- Pi Kappa Delta
- Competitive debating
- Individual Events
