= Leslie Rogne Schumacher =

American academic

Leslie Rogne Schumacher FRSA, FRHistS
- Born: November 2, 1982 (age 44); Fargo, North Dakota
- Education: Hamline University (BA); University of Minnesota (PhD)
- Organizations: Harvard University; Cornell University; Wharton School; FPRI
- Notable work: The Eastern Question in 1870s Britain: Democracy and Diplomacy, Orientalism and Empire (2023)

Leslie Rogne Schumacher is an American historian, writer, and professor of international relations. He teaches at Harvard Kennedy School and is a Faculty Affiliate in the school's Belfer Center for Science and International Affairs as well as an Associate in Harvard's History Department. He also holds research posts at the Mario Einaudi Center for International Affairs at Cornell University and the Foreign Policy Research Institute. He was the fourth David H. Burton Fellow at Saint Joseph's University. He later served as Wells College's Director of the Intelligence Community Center for Academic Excellence, funded by the US Office of the Director of National Intelligence. He has taught at the University of Pennsylvania's Wharton School in the Lauder Institute of Management & International Studies, and he previously served on the faculty of the Sant'Anna Institute in Sorrento, Italy.

Schumacher publishes in the fields of Mediterranean studies, British history, diplomacy and international relations, intelligence and national security, and migration studies. He frequently collaborates with fellow Mediterranean scholar Andrekos Varnava, Editor-in-Chief of the Journal of Imperial and Commonwealth History. In honor of his book on the Eastern Question, Great Powers diplomacy, Victorian politics and society, and British imperialism, titled The Eastern Question in 1870s Britain: Democracy and Diplomacy, Orientalism and Empire (2023), he was elected a Fellow of the Royal Historical Society in 2024. Calling it a "remarkable monograph," M. Şükrü Hanioğlu states this book "heralds a major methodological rupture" that "deftly weaves together cultural history with diplomatic analysis." Schumacher's further work on nationalism and the history of European integration theory features in graduate programs in Middle East studies, imperialism, and the European Union. He is a member of the advisory board of the Marmara Journal of European Studies and the editorial board of Akropolis: Journal of Hellenic Studies. He has served on the board of the scholarly organization Britain and the World, including as Vice-Chair.

Schumacher regularly provides commentary on current events, including for venues like National Public Radio, the Smithsonian Institution, War on the Rocks, and History News Network. He is also active in civil discourse, debate, and leadership initiatives, serving as a board member of the Pennsylvania High School Speech League and as Director of the Senior Leadership Program for the Great Books Summer Program at Haverford College. In 2017, he was elected a Fellow of the Royal Society of Arts in honor of his work on refugee affairs in the Greater Philadelphia area.

== Selected works ==
- Transnational Nationalism in the Mediterranean Sea: Origins and Aftermaths. London: Anthem Press, 2027 (forthcoming).
- "Britain's Amical Protectorate: The Ionian Islands from Napoleon to Union with Greece, 1797-1864." Chapter in Oxford Handbook of Modern Greek History. Ed. Stefanos Katsikas. Oxford: Oxford University Press, 2026.
- "Seeking securo asilo: Malta's Italian Refugee Crisis, 1815-1848." Chapter in Forced Migration: Exiles and Refugees in the UK and the British Empire, 1810s-1940s. Eds. Andrekos Varnava, Yianni Cartledge, and Evan Smith. Leiden: Brill, 2025.
- "Old Crossroads and New Frontiers: BRICS+, the European Union, and the Mediterranean Sea." Article in Transatlantic Policy Quarterly 22, no. 4 (2023/24), 102-109.
- The Eastern Question in 1870s Britain: Democracy and Diplomacy, Orientalism and Empire. London: Palgrave Macmillian, 2023.
- "In Brief: The Mediterranean Migrant Crisis." War on the Rocks, August 22, 2023.
- "Small Islands, Global Challenges: Greece, COVID, and Mediterranean Migration." White paper for the Foreign Policy Research Institute, May 3, 2021.
- "Malta, Italy, and Mediterranean Migration: A Long History and an Ongoing Issue." White paper for the Foreign Policy Research Institute, September 24, 2020.
- "Outrage and Imperialism, Confusion and Indifference: Punch and the Armenian Massacres of 1894-1896." Chapter in Comic Empires: The Imperialism of Cartoons, Caricature, and Satirical Art. Eds. Richard Scully and Andrekos Varnava. Manchester: Manchester University Press, 2020.
- "Greek Expectations: Britain and the Ionian Islands, 1815-1864." Chapter in Imperial Expectations and Realities: El Dorados, Utopias and Dystopias. Ed. Andrekos Varnava. Manchester: Manchester University Press, 2015.
- "The Eastern Question as a Europe Question: Viewing the Ascent of 'Europe' through the Lens of Ottoman Decline." Article in the Journal of European Studies 44, no. 1 (2014), 64-80.

== Selected honors ==
- 2011 Theofanis George Stavrou Eastern Orthodox History & Culture Fellowship Award
- 2016, 2017, & 2018 David H. Burton Fellowship Award
- 2017 Elected Fellow, Royal Society of Arts
- 2024 Elected Fellow, Royal Historical Society
- 2026 Fondation Maison des Sciences de l'Homme THÉMIS Fellowship Award
