= Speech team =

Speech team may refer to:

- Individual events (speech)
- Debate
