= Competitive debate in the United States =

National occurrence of competitive debate

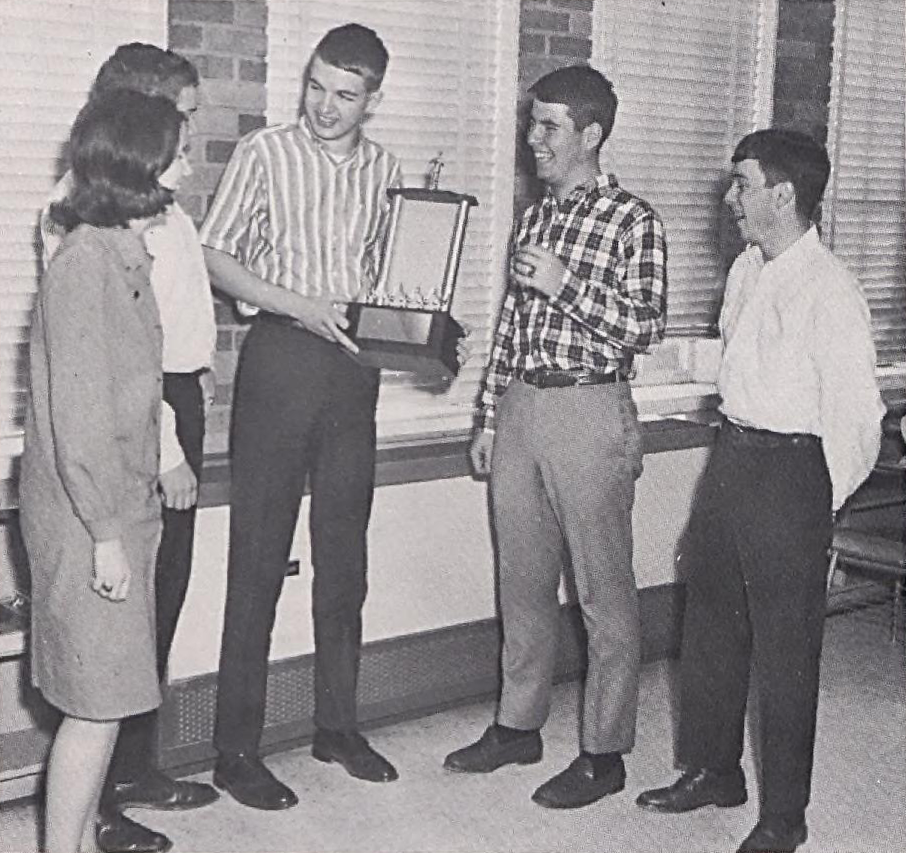
Debaters from High Point Central High School pose with their championship trophy in 1965

Competitive debate, also known as 'forensics' or 'speech and debate', is an activity in which two or more people take positions on an issue and are judged on how well they defend those positions. The activity has been present in academic spaces in the United States since the colonial period. The practice, an import from British education, began as in-class exercises in which students would present arguments to their classmates about the nature of rhetoric. Over time, the nature of those conversations began to shift towards philosophical questions and current events, with Yale University being the first to allow students to defend any position on a topic they believed in. In the late nineteenth century, student-led literary societies began to compete with each other academically and often engaged in debates against each other. In 1906, the first intercollegiate debate league, Delta Sigma Rho, was formed, followed by several others. Competitive debate expanded to the secondary school level in 1925 with the founding of the National Speech and Debate Association, which grew to over 300,000 members by 1969. Technological advances such as the accessibility of personal computers in the 1990s and 2000s has led to debate cases becoming more complex and to evidence being more accessible. Competitors and coaches have made efforts to reduce discrimination in the debate community by introducing new arguments and recruiting debaters from underprivileged communities.

There are a wide variety of competitive debate formats, including the 2v2 Public forum debate, the 1v1 Lincoln–Douglas format, and the 2v2v2v2 British Parliamentary. Regardless of format, most debate rounds use a set topic and have two sides, with one team supporting the topic and the other team opposing the topic. Teams work through a series of speeches presenting their cases, responding to their opponent's arguments, and defending their case. Participation in competitive debate has been associated with positive outcomes for competitors across a wide variety of metrics, including standardized test scores, civic engagement, and future career outcomes, but has been criticized for forcing participants to defend positions they may not agree with and for its inaccessibility to laypeople at its highest levels. Notable former debaters include U.S. senator Ted Cruz and Supreme Court Justice Ketanji Brown Jackson.

== History ==
=== Debate as an intramural activity ===
Competitive debate in the United States can be traced back to colonial times. As the earliest colleges in America were modeled after British universities, they adopted in-class debates as a pedagogical tool. Initially, these took the form of "syllogistic disputations," highly-structured conversations in Latin which were expected to follow the strict rules of logic. These conversations often focused on the nature of public speaking itself, rather than broader social issues. Students quickly took a dislike to the conversations, with one student at Harvard University describing them as "packs of profound nonsense." Benjamin Wadsworth attempted to continue the practice after becoming the university's president in 1725, but encountered such difficulty getting students cooperation in the exercises that within ten years the number of required disputations was halved. The last recorded syllogistic disputation at any university was held at Brown University in 1809.

This early form of debate was replaced by "forensic disputations," which were first introduced at Yale University in 1747. In 1750, Yale's President Clap introduced debates in English alongside the old method of syllogistic disputations in Latin, which earned the approval of Benjamin Franklin. The structure of forensic disputations was informal and allowed for more natural conversations. Students were not assigned sides, rather, they were allowed to contemplate the topic and defend whichever side they believed in. While a student at Harvard, John Quincy Adams regularly participated in forensic disputations, noting in a 1786 letter to his mother that "It comes in course for me to affirm...Whatever the question may be, I must support it." Unlike syllogistic disputations, the topics for forensic disputations often veered towards the hot-button issues of the time: A list of topics debated at Yale in 1832 included questions relating to Native American civil rights, universal suffrage, and capital punishment. Despite their similarity to modern forms of debate, forensic disputations eventually fell out of fashion as well, with student discontent again being a factor. The disputations relied on heavily researched and pre-written cases on each side, but by 1843 most American universities were stressing extemporaneous and oral debate.

Around the time of the forensic disputation's decline, university literary societies began gaining prominence. Institutions would often have multiple student-led societies, each of which would compete with the other academically. Students preferred debating within the societies instead of classrooms as it gave them more control over topic selection and the structure of the round. The first of these societies to admit women was the Oberlin Young Ladies Association, which was founded at Oberlin College in 1835. Meetings of the association typically involved the discussion of a controversial question followed by a debate between two members on the question. Literary societies saw substantial decline during the American Civil War, with the few remaining becoming full-fledged debating societies, teams, and clubs. By the 1890s, literary societies had created standardized structures for debate rounds consisting of prepared cases and extemporaneous rebuttals in a close approximation of modern-day practices.

=== Development of intercollegiate debate ===
In 1873, a group of public speaking enthusiasts at Knox College organized the first intercollegiate public speaking organization, known as the Interstate Oratorical Association, which held a yearly competition. The group quickly grew to include chapters in fourteen states and was followed by several other leagues in other regions of the country. While many sources cite the first intercollegiate debate as occurring between Harvard and Yale in 1892, the first recorded intercollegiate debate at the University of Oregon took place in 1891, when Oregon debated Willamette University on labor issues, marking the program’s entry into the regional intercollegiate stage.

From 1904 to 1911, a flurry of intercollegiate debate activity led to the establishment of four different honor societies, or leagues, for debate. Those organizations were Delta Sigma Rho, Tau Kappa Alpha, Phi Alpha Tau, and Pi Kappa Delta. Delta Sigma Rho was founded by a conglomerate of state universities in Chicago in 1906 and quickly became known as the honor society for large universities and Ivy League institutions. Columbia, Harvard, Princeton, and Yale were all members.Tau Kappa Alpha, founded in 1908 by a committee of students from various Indiana institutions, established a system where each state could only have one chapter. Because of this, it became highly selective with its membership. Phi Alpha Tau, founded in 1904 at Emerson College, allowed debaters and non-debaters alike to join, provided they could show an interest in rhetoric. Delta Sigma Rho and Tau Kappa Alpha would eventually merge in 1963, while Phi Alpha Tau is now a communicative arts fraternity at Emerson College.

In 1911, Pi Kappa Delta was founded at Ottawa University by John A. Shields and Edgar A. Vaughn. Shields, an undergraduate at the university, had been corresponding with Egbert R. Nichols, a former professor at Ottawa who had recently moved to Ripon College. Upon learning that there was not a nationwide debate league that recognized competitors from smaller colleges, Nichols suggested that students from both institutions form their own league. Shields collaborated with Vaughn, a student at Kansas Agricultural College, to lobby other Kansan debate teams to join their newfound institution. Concurrently, Nichols promoted the organization to fellow professors in Illinois, Missouri, Nebraska, and Iowa. Students at Ripon College wrote a charter for the organization, which was signed in January 1913 after several rounds of revisions. In the first two years of the organization, it granted 14 institutional memberships and hundreds of individual memberships across seven states.

Women were generally not allowed to participate in intercollegiate debate until the 1920s. In 1897, the University of Wisconsin refused to allow female debaters from the University of Iowa to participate in a competition, saying that "ladies in that capacity do no credit either to themselves or to co-education in general." The first female debaters were from the University of Indiana and participated in their first intercollegiate debate on May 12, 1921. Carly Woods, an American professor of communications, writes that female debaters faced opposition because men assumed that they would "only be interested in frivolous topics." By 1927, the number of women participating in intercollegiate debate had grown to such an extent that 90% of debate teams had female competitors.

=== Advent of high school debate ===
Competitive debating stayed a primarily intercollegiate activity until Bruno E. Jacob founded the National Forensic League (NFL)—since renamed as the National Speech and Debate Association (NSDA)—in 1925. A professor at Ripon College, Jacob was inspired by a letter he received asking if a debate league for high school students existed. Upon learning that there was no nationwide league, Jacob established the NFL on March 28, 1925, and within a year the league had 100 member schools around the country. While some high school organizations like North Carolina's High School Debating Union and the Montana State High-School Debate League existed, they only allowed students to compete up to the state level. In 1937, the NFL established a "National Student Congress," a debate event in which students roleplay as members of the United States Congress. During World War II the NFL suspended all operations except for Congressional debate, receiving a letter of commendation from President Franklin Delano Roosevelt. In 1950 Jacob resigned from his teaching post to devote himself to the NFL on a full-time basis. By the time of his resignation in 1969, the league had grown to over 300,000 student members.

In 1963, U.S. Senator B. Everett Jordan introduced a bill to require the Librarian of Congress to prepare a report on the Policy debate topics at the high school and intercollegiate level each year. This bill was eventually adopted into law, with annual reports published to this day.

=== Rise of "progressive" debate ===
The activity of debate continued to grow, eventually becoming large enough to not require invited judges, such as policy experts or professors of rhetoric. By the mid-1970s, tournaments were often judged by former or current competitors. In 1972, the Tournament of Champions was founded by J.W. Patterson, director of debate at the University of Kentucky. The tournament was specifically designed as a tournament without inexperienced judges. With these developments, team strategy began to move away from a "public model" geared at a general audience and towards a "policy-making" model. Allan Louden, tracing these developments at the National Debate Tournament, noted that "as speed rapidly increased...debate became more analytical, geared to expert audiences."

In the 1980s, a new argument called a "kritik" was introduced to intercollegiate debate. Kritiks are a unique type of argument that argue "that there is a harm created by the assumption created or used by the other side"—that is, there is some other issue that must be addressed before the topic can be debated. Early pioneers of the kritik used them primarily as a supplement to other arguments rather than as stand-alone cases. Kritiks faced criticism from traditional debaters and judges because they did not require competitors to directly debate the assigned topic. Nevertheless, they took hold and remain a stable of intercollegiate and high school debate today. Most recently, some debaters have advanced an argumentation style known as "performance debate" which emphasizes "identity, narrative understandings, and confrontation of life's disparities." This argumentation style, advanced predominantly by Black debaters, has been used by debaters to discuss issues related to identity and difference. An early pioneer of these styles of debate was the University of Louisville debate team, led by Ed Warner.

As debate techniques continued to become more progressive, new debate leagues were formed to accommodate different styles. The Cross Examination Debate Association (CEDA) was established in 1971. Jack Howe, the first president of CEDA, described the association as being "a reaction against a prevailing style of debate that both participants and their directors found increasingly difficult to support. CEDA prioritized an "audience-oriented" form of debate which required strong presentation skills along with evidence. It grew quickly, becoming the largest intercollegiate debate league by 1990. In 1985, the American Debate Association was founded, also as a reaction to new debate techniques. Seeking to revitalize intercollegiate policy debate, the American Debate Association set clear rules for both competitors and judges: Among the rules were a ban on kritiks, a limit on speech speed, and a restriction on judge's ability to read evidence after round.

As technology advanced throughout the late 1990s and early 2000s, debaters consistently adopted newer techniques to incorporate technological developments. For much of the 1900s, debaters cataloged different pieces of evidence on "cards," which were photocopied sections of newspaper articles and books pasted to index cards. For policy debaters, who debated the same topic for an entire year, the number of cards could quickly become overwhelming, sometimes requiring 100,000 pieces of paper and 50 boxes of cards per team. As internet research became more accessible, teams began moving to entirely paperless debate, storing research on Word documents. In 2008 the Whitman College debate team, led by Jim Hanson, became the first college-level team to go entirely digital, leading them to be described as "the greenest in the country." As cases moved to electronic formats, debaters began posting their work in publicly available wikis to make research more accessible to debaters from smaller schools. These "caselist wikis" have been described by G. Thomas Goodnight and Gordon Mitchell as creating "intricate and detailed map[s]" of various controversies falling under debate topics and as being a valuable resource for a slate of non-debate professions as well, including legislators, journalists, and policy analysts.

Numerous universities and colleges offer training workshops for high school and collegiate debaters, called "debate camp" or a "debate institute". They are typically over the summer and lasting multiple weeks.

== Structure of competitive debate ==
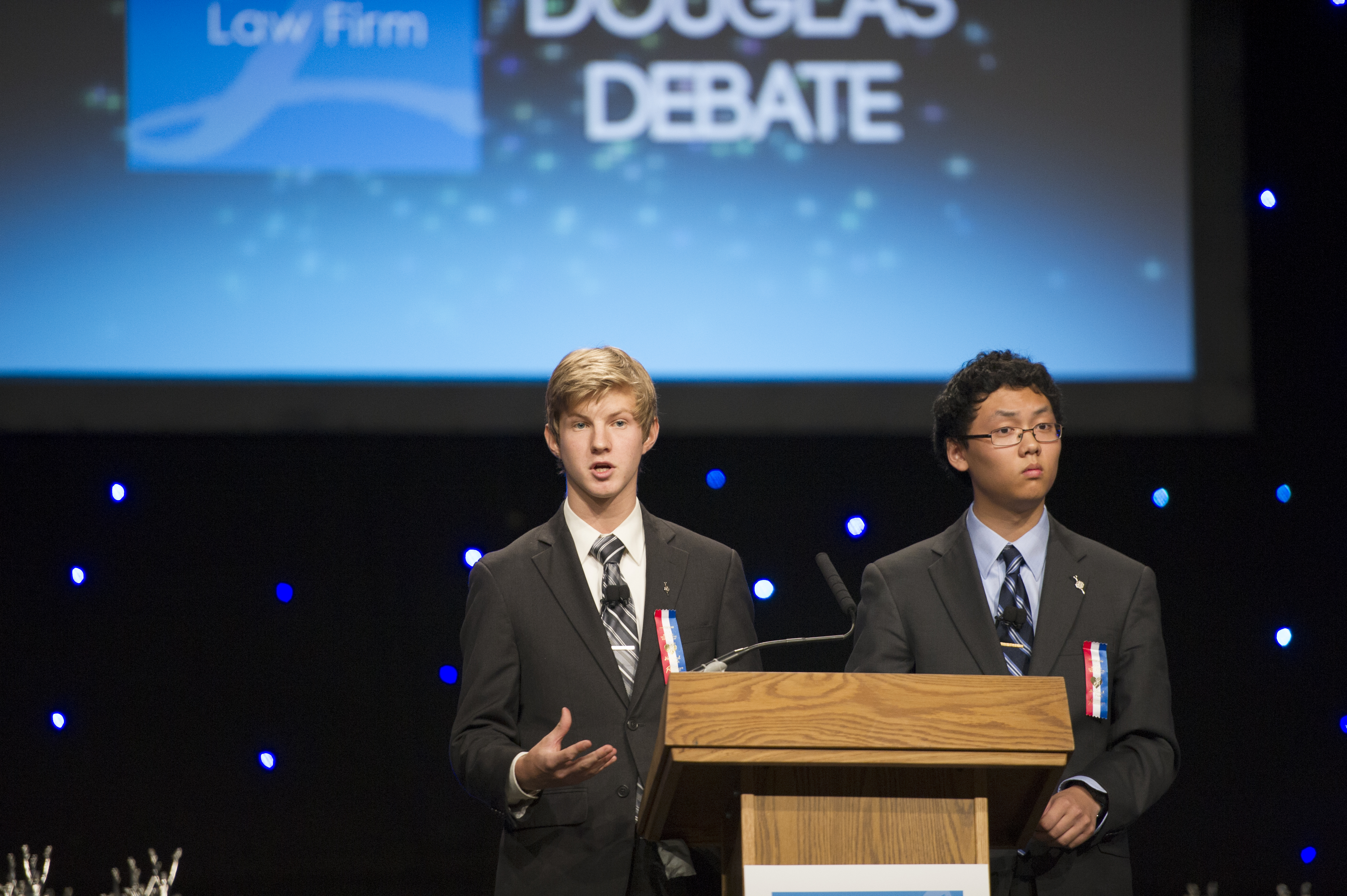
Lincoln-Douglas debaters at the 2014 NSDA National Tournament

In the United States, there are a wide variety of debate formats and leagues to support them. At the high school level, the predominant league is the National Speech and Debate Association, which offers seven debate events and eighteen speaking events. Other high school leagues, such as the National Catholic Forensic League, National Christian Forensics and Communications Association, and Stoa USA, offer similar events. Intercollegiate leagues vary, but generally only offer a single style of debate.

The basic structure of most debate rounds, regardless of the specific format, is as follows: A topic is presented to the teams, who either choose a side of the topic or are assigned one. The "affirmative" or "aff" defends the topic and the "negation" or "neg" opposes it. Throughout a round, each team has the opportunity to present a case, respond to their opponent's case, defend their case, and ask questions of their opponent. At the end of a round, the judge evaluates the arguments and determines the winner, awarding "speaker points" to both debaters to grade their presentation separately from their argumentation.

=== Formats ===
- Policy debate is a 2v2 style of debate and the oldest format still regularly practiced in the United States. It features a year-round topic which tends to be vague, requiring affirmative debaters to present a detailed plan explaining how they would implement the topic. Because there are a substantial number of plans the affirmative could run, policy debate requires substantially more research than other topics.
- Lincoln-Douglas debate is a 1v1 style of debate based on the structure of the Lincoln–Douglas debates of 1858. Lincoln-Douglas topics change every two months and are typically statements of value that require the sides to discuss the merits of different philosophical schools of thought.
- Public forum debate is a 2v2 style of debate with topics that change every two months in the fall and every month in the spring. The event was developed by Ted Turner, the founder of CNN, specifically so that there could be an event focused on being accessible to laypeople. Public Forum debates tend to focus on current events issues and require debaters to defend either the status quo or a specified change to the status quo.
- Big Questions is a 1v1, 2v1, or 2v2 style of debate with a year-round topic related to morality, religion, and science. The event was created by the John Templeton Foundation and competitors have previously debated topics such as "Science leaves no room for free will" and "Objective morality exists."
- Congressional Debate is a simulation of government proceedings with many debaters in a room together roleplaying as legislators. Students typically begin by electing one member to serve as the "Presiding Officer," equivalent to the position of Speaker of the United States House of Representatives, who sets an order of bills. Competitors generally use a packet of bills submitted by schools across their competition area that were written by students.
- World Schools Debate is a 3v3 style of debate with a topic that changes every round. Tournaments typically consist of multiple impromptu and prepared rounds. In impromptu rounds, teams have some time between the topic announcement and the round beginning to prepare cases. In prepared rounds, the topic is generally announced before the beginning of the tournament so that teams can write cases beforehand.
- British Parliamentary is a 2v2v2v2 style where four teams, two on each side of the topic, debate each other. Each round is impromptu with the topic announced shortly before the beginning of the round. Despite there being two teams on each side of the topic, the teams are ranked out of four and may not collaborate with each other.

== Competitor outcomes ==
Participation in competitive debate is associated with positive outcomes for competitors. Advocates for debate education, such as former United States Secretary of Education Arne Duncan, cite debate education as being "uniquely suited" to developing "critical thinking, communication, collaboration, and creativity." Former competitors generally describe their time as competitive debaters positively, describing it as leading to broadened worldviews and a more well-rounded education.

At the high school level, debate competitors outscore non-debate competitors on standardized tests and have higher grade point averages (GPAs). One study found that competitors in the Chicago urban debate league (UDL) were more likely to graduate high school, scored an additional point higher on all portions of the ACT test, and had significantly higher GPAs. Another study, also focused on the Chicago UDL, found that "debaters report greater social, civic, and social engagement than non-debaters." A study of Colorado students found a small yet statistically significant relationship between debate participation and higher standardized test scores. This effect has been especially noted among at-risk and African American students. Briana Mezuk found in a 2009 study that African American male students who participated in debate were more likely to graduate and have stronger reading comprehension than their peers who did not participate in debate.

Similar results have been observed among intercollegiate competitors. A two-decade cohort study by Rogers, Freeman, and Rennels recorded competitors' civic engagement, career trajectory, and continued education. Intercollegiate competitors were more likely to vote, volunteer, have diverse friend groups, and have healthier personality profiles. They were also more likely to receive pay raises and promotions.

== Controversies ==
=== Discrimination within the community ===
Multiple studies have noted that female debaters tend to underperform male debaters, a disparity has noted at both the high school and intercollegiate levels. One study, comparing 125,087 high school debate rounds across two different seasons, found that female-female teams were 17.1% less likely to win and male-female teams were 10% less likely to win when competing against a male-male team. Female debaters were also found to be 30.3% more likely to quit the activity. This disparity can be at least partially attributed to the subjective nature of a debate round, with a 2022 qualitative study of high school debate competitors finding that the "norms surrounding what it means to be a 'good' debater" often played into gender biases.

Racial minorities have also been historically underrepresented in the debate community, although the issue is less studied than that of female participation. A 1987 study by Brenda Logue found that only 11.1% of participants in CEDA tournaments were minorities, despite 17% of college students being non-white. Later studies have found similar rates, with Pamela Stepp noting that the "community has not kept up with the changing college population" in 1997. A 2004 analysis of competitors in the American Forensic Association found that intercollegiate participation was dominated by European Americans but that minority participation in most programs was over 25%. In the 2019 season, only 8.6% of college debate directors were Black, slightly over half what would be representative.

Efforts were made to increase minority participation in debate as early as the 1980s, when the Barkley Forum funded the creation of an urban debate league in Atlanta focused on increasing inner-city school participation in debate. Similar programs were created in other cities over the following years, with programs in 20 cities by 2012. At the intercollegiate level, the Louisville Project was started at the University of Louisville in the 1990s. The team's coach, Ede Warner, made a concerted effort to recruit African American debaters and required the team to utilize race-based arguments. Under his leadership, the team heavily criticized the use of expert evidence in rounds and argued that arguments from personal experience offered a unique lens through which the topic could be examined. The response to the Louisville Project has been characterized by Shanara Reid-Brinkley as being "defined by anger," with coaches who disagreed with Warner forming competing leagues that barred race-centered argumentation and releasing out-of-context footage of Black debaters in attempts to encourage colleges to shut down their debate teams.

=== Criticisms of debate ===
The basic format of competitive debate, in which competitors are required to research both sides of a topic, has faced criticism. In 1954, amid the Cold War, a group of colleges refused to debate the topic "The United States should diplomatically recognize the People's Republic of China" because doing so would require them to argue against the current U.S. policy. In the wake of this controversy, Richard Murphy, a professor of speech at the University of Illinois, published a series of articles criticizing the practice of debating both sides of a topic. He argued that debate, as a form of public speaking, required debaters to publicly commit to their positions within a debate round. Quoting Brooks Quimby, a prolific debate coach at Bates College, Murphy claimed that debaters needed to be "men and women of principle" rather than "men and women trained to take either side at the flip of a coin." In 1964, a survey of debate coaches across the country found that 95% believed debating both sides of a topic to be ethical, and the authors declared the controversy to be "pau," or finished.

Other criticisms of the format of debate have been presented. Jonathan Ellis wrote in The New York Times that competitive debate promotes biased reasoning by giving debaters a specific view to work backward from rather than allowing them to come to their own unique position on a topic. James Dimock, a debate coach at Minnesota State University, presented two objections to competitive debate in a 2009 paper: First, as debate topics have grown more complex debaters are incentivized to be concise over complete in their analyses, and second, debaters are often rewarded for making arguments from authority rather than logically sound arguments. Neal Katyal has responded to some criticisms of debate by arguing that taking a position in a debate round, which exists to interrogate arguments, is different from advocating a position in a public square. He furthered that debate topics tend to avoid forcing debaters into advocating for positions widely considered ethically indefensible.

Spreading, the practice of reading arguments at speeds incomprehensible to a layperson, has faced criticism for creating an environment where the team that can read more arguments wins, regardless of persuasiveness. Former national champion parliamentary debater and U.S. Senator Ted Cruz described it as "a pernicious disease that has undermined the very essence of high school and college debate." Defenders of the practice, such as Justin Eckstein, claim that it prioritizes critical thinking and research and that debaters will inevitably prioritize speed to read more arguments.

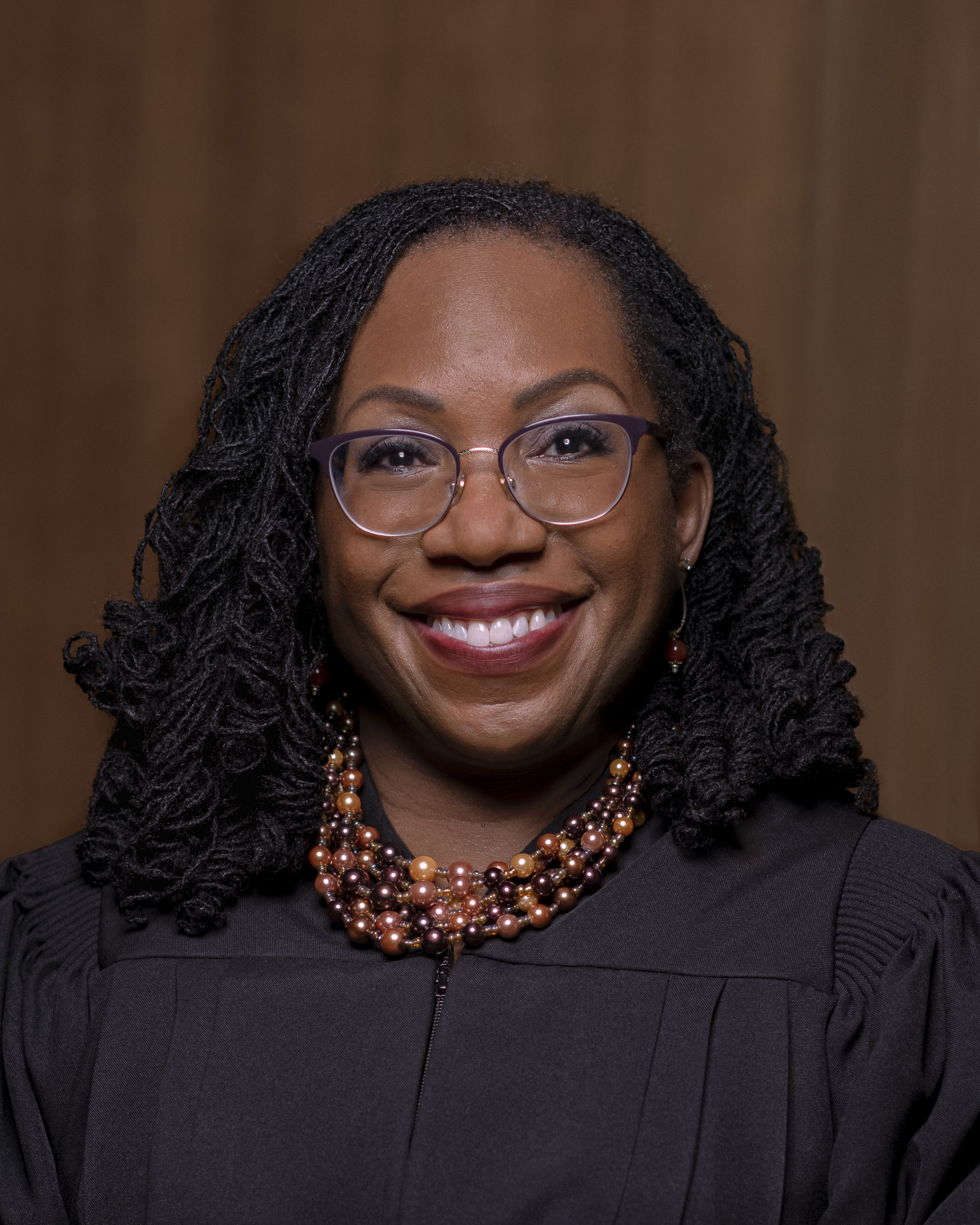
Supreme Court Justice Ketanji Brown Jackson is a former debater

== Notable former competitors ==
- Samuel Alito, high school debater and Associate Justice of the U.S. Supreme Court
- William Lane Craig, high school debater and Christian apologist.
- Ted Cruz, collegiate parliamentary debater at Princeton University and U.S. senator
- James Farmer, collegiate debater at Wiley College and civil rights activist.
- Ketanji Brown Jackson, high school debater at Miami Palmetto Senior High School and Associate Justice of the U.S. Supreme Court
- Carlos Maza, high school debater at Christopher Columbus High School and journalist.
- Bo Seo, collegiate debater at Harvard University and journalist.
- Sonia Sotomayor, high school debater and Associate Justice of the U.S. Supreme Court
- Elizabeth Warren, high school debater at Northwest Classen High School and U.S. Senator
- Pope Leo XIV, high school debater at St. Augustine Seminary High School and 267th Pope of the Catholic Church

== In popular culture ==
- The 1989 drama film Listen to Me is about a collegiate debate team who receive the opportunity to argue in front of the Supreme Court of the United States.
- The 2007 film Rocket Science directed by Jeffery Blitz is about the fictional New Jersey High School student Hal Hefner who is recruited to the debate squad by classmate Ginny Ryerson, who has lost her debate partner and wants to transform Hal into a debate prodigy.
- The 2007 biographical film The Great Debaters is about the Wiley College debate team coached by Melvin B. Tolson.
- The 2017 young-adult novel Dear Martin, by Nic Stone, follows the captain of a high school debate team as he responds to racial discrimination within his school.
- The 2017 film Speech & Debate is about a group of high school students trying to revive their debate team.
- The 2018 romantic comedy Candy Jar is about two rival high school debaters competing for college scholarships.
- The 2022 documentary Girl Talk follows five female high school debaters in Massachusetts.
- The 2025 documentary Speak follows five high school competitors throughout their preparation for the 2024 NSDA National Speech & Debate Tournament.

== See also ==
- Boys/Girls State
- Junior State of America
- Mock trial in the United States
- Model United Nations in the United States
