= Extemporaneous commentary =

Extemporaneous commentary (or extemp com for short) is a branch of normal extemporaneous speaking, an area of competition in high school forensics. Students participating in extemporaneous commentary are given 20 minutes to prepare a five-minute speech (with a 30-second grace period) on a topic relevant to modern politics, pop culture, current events, etc. Students in commentary deliver their speeches sitting down, usually on the opposite side of a table from the judge(s). Students are scored based on oration skills, speech organization, and use of sources and are ranked by the judges in comparison to the other competitors who give speeches in the same room.

At the beginning of a tournament, students participating in this event are brought to a holding room, where an order is assigned (usually by picking numbers at random). The first student then draws three topics, chooses one which s/he finds best, and then is given his/her 20 minutes of preparation. The remaining students draw their topics at seven-minute intervals to ensure that no student gets extra time to prepare. After all the students have given a speech, the judges rank the students in order of who they believed performed the best based on the categories above.

Originally, extemporaneous commentary topics were more general and more focused on opinions than extemporaneous topics were, making extemp commentary an almost "halfway point" between impromptu speaking and normal extemp. However, the success of those who integrated more sources into their speeches, plus the trending of the topics to mimic extemp's, has blurred the line between extemporaneous and extemporaneous commentary. In some cases extemp commentary has a shorter prep time, and shorter speeches. The only definitive difference between extemp and extemp commentary is the position in which the speeches are given (standing as opposed to sitting).

Extemp commentary has been an event at the National Speech and Debate Tournament since 1985.
