= National Speech and Debate Association =

American interscholastic association

- NSDA
- Founded: March 28, 1925; 101 years ago Ripon College
- Type: Debate
- Affiliation: Independent
- Status: Active
- Emphasis: Middle and high school
- Scope: National
- Pillars: Equity, Integrity, Respect, Leadership, and Service
- Member badge
- Chapters: 3,730
- Members: 141,132 active 2,000,000+ lifetime
- Former name: National Forensics League
- Headquarters: 6600 Westown Parkway Suite 270; West Des Moines, Iowa 50266; United States
- Website: speechanddebate.org

The National Speech & Debate Association (NSDA) is the largest interscholastic speech and debate organization serving middle school and high school students in the United States. It was formed as the National Forensic League in 1925 by Bruno Ernst Jacob.

== History ==
=== 20th century ===
As a Ripon College student, Jacob created a pocket handbook, Suggestions for the Debater. After becoming a professor at Ripon College, Jacob received a letter inquiring about the existence of a debate honor society. This led to the founding of the National Forensic League, with the earliest members joining on March 28, 1925.

The National Forensic League was an honor society that recognized middle and high school students and coaches for participation in speech and debate activities. Students earned merit points for participation and were held to a Code of Honor.

Karl Mundt served as the organization's national president from 1932 until 1971.

=== 21st century ===
The League's name was changed on May 17, 2013, to the National Speech & Debate Association and the National Speech & Debate Association's Honor Society. A press release explained "As a communication organization, we need to effectively communicate who we are and what we do. There is a common misunderstanding of 'NFL' or 'forensics,' including confusion with the National Football League or crime scene investigation; changing our name to focus on the activity of speech and debate will appeal to more students, coaches, alumni, sponsors, and the general public."

As of 2024, the league has 141,132 student members and 2,000,000 alumni. It has chapters at 3,152 high schools and 578 middle school chapters. Its headquarters are located in West Des Moines, Iowa.

== Symbols ==
NSDA's core values or pillars are Equity, Integrity, Respect, Leadership, and Service. After its name change in 2014, the association retained its original insignia, including keys, pins, and seals.

== Membership ==
Members in the National Speech & Debate Association's Honor Society earn points and are recognized by increasing membership degrees, including membership, merit, honor, excellence, distinction, special distinction, superior distinction, outstanding distinction, and premier distinction.

Beyond personal membership, NSDA also grants a multitude of resources and awards to competitors including college scholarships, fundraising, and program grants that empower members on a national-scale; a student leadership council allowing youth to improve existing programming; and student, coach, and school recognition programs.

== Activities ==
NSDA provides competitive speech and debate activities, resources, comprehensive training, scholarship opportunities, and advanced recognition to more than 140,000 students and coaches each year. The annual National Speech & Debate Tournament marks the capstone of speech and debate activities for more than 140,000 members across the country. Students must qualify for the National Tournament through their District Tournament.

To create standards for national competition, the National Speech & Debate Association defined a number of speech and debate events that are prevalent in the United States that have been adopted by many states.

=== Speech ===
Speech involves a presentation by one or two students that is judged against a similar type of presentation by others in a round of competition. There are two general categories of speech events, public address events and interpretive events.

- Public address events feature a speech written by the student, either in advance or with limited prep, that can answer a question, share a belief, persuade an audience, or educate the listener on a variety of topics.
- Interpretation events center upon a student selecting, performing, and reinterpreting existing published material.

==== Public Address events ====
- Extemporaneous Commentary (COM)
- Declamation (DEC)
- Expository (EXP)
- Impromptu (IMP)
- Informative Speaking (INF)
- International Extemporaneous Speaking (IX)
- Mixed Extemporaneous Speaking (MX)
- Original Oratory (OO)
- Original Spoken Word Poetry (OSW)
- Pro Con Challenge (PCC)
- United States Extemporaneous Speaking (USX)

==== Interpretation events ====
- Dramatic Interpretation (DI)
- Duo Interpretation (DUO)
- Humorous Interpretation (HI)
- Poetry (POE)
- Program Oral Interpretation (POI)
- Prose (PRO)
- Storytelling (STO)

=== Debate ===
Debate involves an individual or a team of students working to effectively convince a judge that their side of a resolution or topic is, as a general principle, more valid. Students in debate come to thoroughly understand both sides of an issue, having researched each extensively, and learn to think critically about every argument that could be made on each side.

==== Debate events ====
- Big Questions (BQ)
- Congressional Debate (House and Senate) (CON)
- Extemporaneous Debate (XDB)
- Lincoln-Douglas Debate (LD)
- Policy Debate (CX)
- Public Forum Debate (PF)
- World Schools Debate (WS)

== Executive Directors ==
Bruno E. Jacob founded the organization and served as the primary administrator under the title "Secretary." Upon his retirement in 1969, he was officially appointed as the first "Executive Director Emeritus." Thus, the position was installed under the title of "Executive Director" in 1969.

#	Secretary & Executive Directors	Term start	Term end	Tenure length
1	Bruno E. Jacob	1925	1969	43–44
2	Lester M. Tucker	1969	1977	7–8
3	Dennis Winfield	1977	1986	8–9
4	James M. Copeland	1986	2003	16–17
5	J. Scott Wunn	2003	Incumbent	22–23

== Notable members ==
From notable politicians to artists and scientists, many NSDA alumni have risen to the pinnacle of their respective fields.

== See also ==
- Competitive debate in the United States
- Honor society
- Student society
