= Individual events (speech) =

Overview of individual events in speech

Individual events in speech include public speaking, limited preparation, acting and interpretation are a part of forensics competitions. These events do not include the several different forms of debate offered by many tournaments. These events are called individual events because they tend to be done by one person unlike debate which often includes teams. This distinction however is not entirely accurate any more given the addition of duo interpretation events and forms of single person debate. Competitive speech competitions and debates comprise the area of forensics. Forensics leagues have a number of speech events, generally determined by geographical region or league preference. While there are several key events that have been around a long time, there are several experimental events around the country every year that can be limited to individual tournaments. Forensics leagues in the United States includes the National Speech and Debate Association, the National Christian Forensics and Communications Association, the American Forensics Association, the National Forensics Association, the Interstate Oratorical Association and Stoa USA. Organized competitions are held at the high-school and collegiate level. Outside of the rules for each event provided by the individual leagues, there are several cultural norms within each region that are not written into law but are almost always followed. Rules for time limits vary by event and by individual tournaments, but there are penalties in every event for exceeding the time limits though the severity of the penalty widely varies.

== Public-speaking events ==
The public speaking events are typically memorized speeches that can be on any topic the competitor desires. Typically, the same speech is used for the entire competitive season but may not be used in more than one season. For the public speaking events, they are performed with the purpose to use information to relate a message to an audience.

=== Original Oratory ===
In Original Oratory, a competitor prepares an original speech which may be informative or persuasive in nature. A competitor may use one speech for the entire season. The purpose of Oratory is to inspire belief or reinforce conviction.

At the high-school level, the speech is generally delivered without visual aids or notes. In many leagues (including the two U.S. tournaments), the number of directly quoted words from other sources in the speech is limited; at the NFL nationals, the limit is 150 words. Speeches are generally eight to ten minutes in length, with a warning often given when the allowed time has expired; most tournaments have a 30-second grace period.

=== Persuasion ===
Persuasion is often considered the collegiate equivalent of Oratory. The focus of the event is to change, reinforce, or instill the attitudes, beliefs, and values of the audience. Although few rules that dictate what topics or formats are permissible in persuasion, most persuasion speeches are policy-based; speakers advocate a specific policy proposal to address a need, offering their recommendation in a problem-cause-solution or cause-effect-solution format. In 2006, the winning persuasion topics at the American Forensics Association (AFA) and National Forensics Association (NFA) were how to improve teacher retention and encourage citizens to correspond with their members of Congress. This style of speech is also featured at the Interstate Oratorical Association - the oldest public speaking organization in the US - where the top persuasive speakers from each state compete at an annual national contest.

=== Informative ===
Informative speaking, also known as Expository Address, is a speech meant to inform the audience. The speech may range from the newest, high tech inventions from around the world to cure cancer to lighthearted topics, such as Wikipedia. The speech is supposed to be objective, without any judgement or evaluation of the topic. The speaker's job is to make a complex topic easier to understand. In intercollegiate competition, the time limit is ten minutes and the speech is typically memorized. In high-school competition, time limits vary by U.S. state. Some informative speeches use visual aids; visual aids and puns (or wordplay) are emphasized in California, although neither are required.

=== Declamation ===
Declamation, or memorized speech, is the high-school interpretation and presentation of a non-original speech. Speeches may be historical (such as Martin Luther King Jr.'s "I Have a Dream" speech) or adapted from magazine articles, commencement addresses, or other adaptations of non-original material (including forensics speeches from previous years). Declamations are generally persuasive, and the competition is similar to Original Oratory. Like Oratory, speeches are about eight minutes long.

=== Rhetorical criticism ===
Rhetorical criticism, or communication analysis, is an individual collegiate event in which the speaker has ten minutes to present a speech. The speech usually consists of an introduction, the presentation of a rhetorical artifact, a communication theory or model, the application of the communication theory to the artifact, the implications of that analysis, and a conclusion.

The artifact may be anything of rhetorical significance, such as a book, a speech, an advertising campaign, or a protest movement. The speaker identifies the goals the artifact seeks to accomplish. They then select a model form of analysis (typically borrowed from communication scholars) to determine the effectiveness of the artifact in reaching its goal; for example, in analyzing an anti-smoking campaign the speaker might choose a model discussing the most effective methods of employing fear to persuade a mass audience. They would then apply the model to the artifact and draw conclusions about the artifact's strengths and weaknesses, the success or failure of the model as an analytical tool, and other insight gained from the analysis.

=== Special-occasion speaking ===
Special-occasion speaking, a high-school event, is similar to Oratory but focuses on lighter subjects and addresses a specific audience. Although comedy is frequently heard in special-occasion speaking, it should not detract from the message the speaker is trying to relate. The speech is not as strictly persuasive as in Oratory, but can be designed to inform. Speeches are typically six to eight minutes long.

=== After-dinner speaking / Speech to entertain ===
After-dinner speaking or speech to entertain is a public-address event which makes greater sense of a topic with humor. Although it can take the form of any of the accepted public-speaking structures, it often takes the form of an informative or persuasive speech. The event covers a variety of topics, but the use of humor is central to its execution. The speech should not resort to base humor, but should be topical and relevant to the idea presented. This type of speech, found at the collegiate level, is typically six to ten minutes long. Generally, it is a humorous speech with a serious undertone or point.

== Limited-preparation events ==
A limited-preparation event is an event in which the speakers have no prior knowledge of the speech they will give, with a set amount of preparation time to write a short speech. Preparation times vary by event and range from two minutes to an hour, after which the competitors deliver their speeches.

=== Broadcasting ===
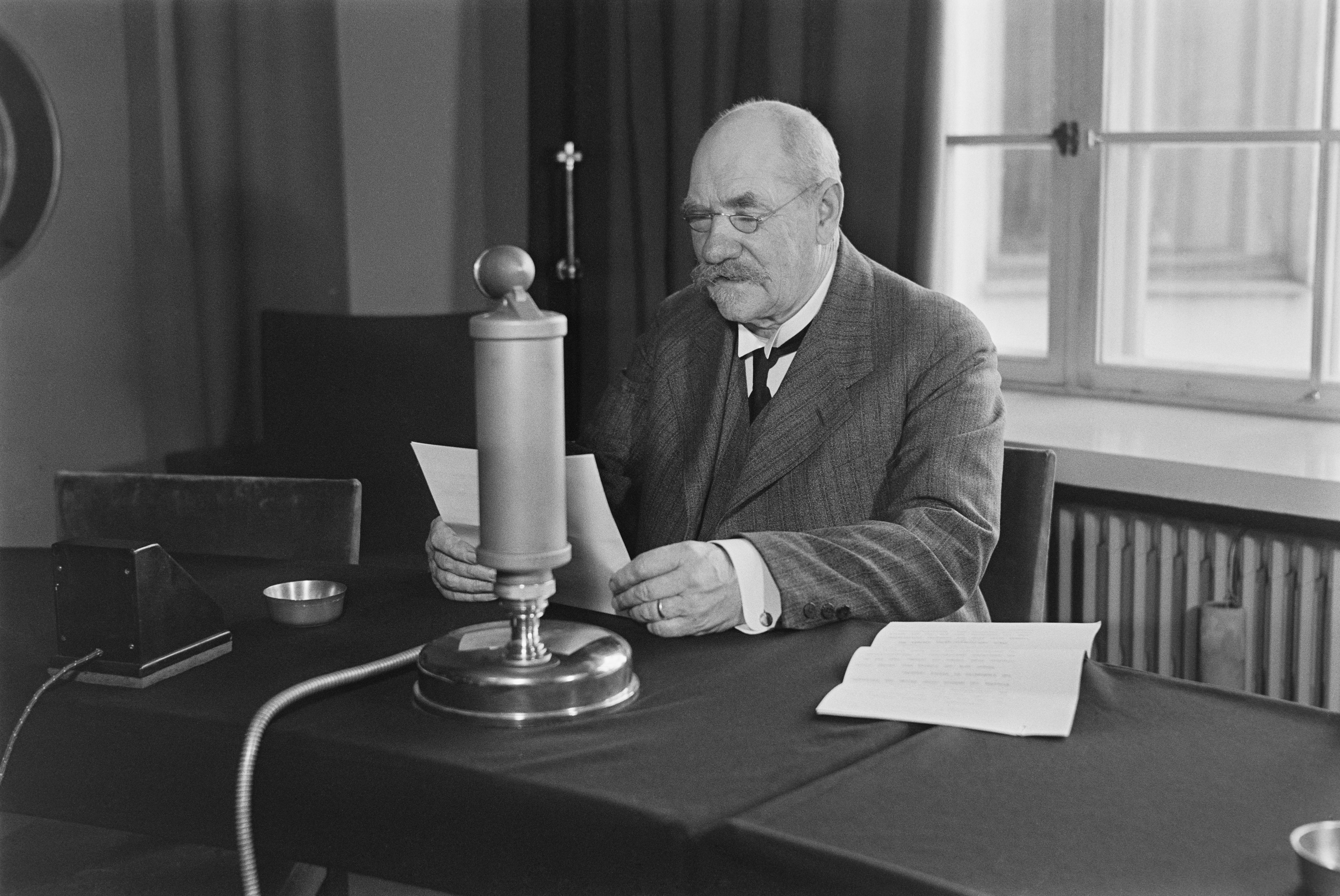
P. E. Svinhufvud, the President of Finland, giving a radio speech in honour of the 10th anniversary of the Finnish Broadcasting Company in 1936.

A radio speech is a prepared event which includes news stories and a commercial. Speakers receive a packet with a prepared newscast and must edit and compile these stories into a five-minute newscast that is unique and engaging. Preparation time varies by state from 15 to 45 minutes. Transitions are expected to be smooth, and the newscast should be as close as possible to five minutes. Scoring is based on reading clarity, adherence to the time limit, and the appeal of the stories chosen.

=== Extemporaneous speaking ===
Extemporaneous speaking is a speech given with little preparation and traditionally without access to the internet for citation (Though many states have opted to allow the use of internet). At the beginning of a round, speakers are usually given three questions relating to current events and asked to choose one on which to prepare a speech. During the preparation period (usually thirty minutes), periodicals may be used to prepare the speech. The speech, presented with limited notes, is six to eight minutes long on the collegiate circuit. The main purpose of the speech to make an argument answering the question given at the beginning of the round and convince the audience that this interpretation is the most correct. Although some high-school competitions divide extemporaneous speaking into domestic and international categories, few collegiate competitions do so.

=== Impromptu speaking ===
In impromptu speaking, competitors are given a topic (usually a word or phrase which may be a person, thing, a well-known saying, a less well-known quotation, a current event, or an object) and compose a speech based on the prompt. Impromptu speeches are usually four to six minutes long (with 15 seconds to seven minutes of preparation time), but other tournaments have no limits on preparation time or speech length. Judging typically focuses on speaking ability (such as enunciation, pace, and vocal variety), creativity, and overall balance of the speech (such as points of roughly-equal length and appropriate length of introduction and conclusion). In many states, impromptu speaking is a contest combining wit and humor with insight; speeches should be funny, but also make a point.

=== Extemporaneous commentary ===
Competitors in extemporaneous commentary are given a topic of national, regional or local importance, and prepare a speech on that topic during a preparation period. Judging focuses on the quality of the vocal presentation, the organization of the speech and the use of sources to back up assertions. The speech is usually presented seated. According to the National Forensic League, the event imitates the work of media commentators who speak about trends or community problems.

=== Extemporaneous programmed reading ===
Extemporaneous programmed reading is a high-school tournament event in North Dakota. It is more similar to interpretation than limited-preparation events, since each round is an interpretation; however, it differs in that each competitor receives the piece for each round in a one-hour draw and read and cut the piece for interpretation. Three kinds of interpretation are represented in different rounds, one of which is used for the finals: humorous, serious, and poetry. Each competitor has seven minutes to deliver the cut interpretation before the judge.

=== Storytelling ===
In storytelling, a high-school event, competitors are given a children's book, fairy tale, fable, myth, legend, or ghost story to read. They have a half-hour to read the given piece and recast it in their own words before presenting their version to the judge in under eight minutes. Stage make-up, costumes, and props are prohibited. Different voices and characters are used, and each character should be easily distinguished.

=== Apologetics ===
In this NCFCA and Stoa USA event, competitors are given four minutes to prepare a six-minute speech on a question relating to Christianity. The questions are published online in advance, and the rules are generally the same as for impromptu speaking.

== Acting and interpretation events ==
Though the purpose of each event differs based on if it is an acting event or an interpretation event, all of these events seek to use different forms of literature to tell a certain theme or story.

=== Dramatic Interpretation ===
In Dramatic Interpretation, a competitor interprets a selection from a dramatic theatrical script. A competitor plays several parts, which are differentiated with a variety of positions and voices. Each character should be clearly distinguishable, and a competitor can also play a single character. The use of a manuscript depends on the individual tournament and circuit, though typically it is required at the college level and not allowed at the high school level.

=== Humorous Interpretation ===
In Humorous Interpretation (shortened to HI or humorous), the humorous alternative to DI at the high-school level, a competitor performs an eight- to ten-minute selection from a humorous literary work. Much of the rules for HI are identical to its dramatic counterpart with the only difference being that the presentation is funny.

=== Original comedy ===
Original comedy is an entirely original event in which competitors write a comic story, the structure of which is entirely up to them. The story often involves a main character and several different side characters which the competitor will "pop" in and out of quickly. No introduction is required and no props or manuscript are allowed. This is a high school event with a time limit of 8 minutes.

=== Serious interpretation ===
Serious interpretation, a high-school event, is open to any literary work.

=== Duo Interpretation ===
Similar to DI and HI, Duo Interpretation pieces have at least two parts performed by two people. In the collegiate level of this event, the presenters are not allowed to make physical or eye contact or use props, can only touch the ground with their feet. There are no props, costumes, or visual aids allowed however in the collegiate circuit a manuscript is often used The body of work can be from one literary source.

=== Duet acting ===
Differing from the college Duo Interpretation, in high school there are two events of duet acting called humorous duet acting and dramatic duet acting. Despite addressing slightly different themes of humor and drama, both events have similar rules. A cutting from only one script is used and though there are still no costumes or visual aids, most tournaments allow for the use of one table and two chairs provided by the tournament. The use of a manuscript is typically not allowed. Differing from the college version, participants are allowed to look and touch their duet partners.

=== Prose interpretation ===
Prose interpretation is the interpretation of a single or multiple works of prose. In many styles of competition, since competitors interpret the literature with facial expression and eye contact, memorization is helpful; however, points may be deducted if a speech is too memorized and the competitor does not appear to be reading. However, in many other styles of competition, such as the MSHSL, memorization is actually encouraged. In college forensics the maximum time allowed is 10 minutes, including an introduction.

=== Poetry interpretation ===
Poetry interpretation is the interpretation of a single or multiple works of poetry centered around a single literary theme. The poetry used can have traditional poetic meter though it is not required. The separate pieces are cut together into a single program that lasts a maximum of 10 minutes, on the college level, with an introduction

=== Program Oral Interpretation ===
Program Oral Interpretation is an event all about intertextuality—this specific event differs from the rest because it focuses on the interrelationship between works of literature. Through the medium of performance, we take what constitutes a text to be almost anything when recorded somehow. Unlike other categories in the Speech and Debate medium, this means you can use anything that is considered text throughout your program to construct a cohesive story. That specifically allows prose, poetry and drama. Program Oral Interpretation means going above and beyond the usual places to find literature and reading anything for all intents and purposes. The intention of Program Oral Interpretation is to seek and demonstrate how different texts relate and speak to one another as if they were having a conversation for the first time. All texts chosen should inevitably be related upon on cohesive topic. Documentaries, spoken word pieces, statistics, news reports, memoirs, and almost anything else, speak to one another through your arrangement to form a cohesive argument. The core of this event is to focus on the argumentation and have the text be a catapult to drive your argumentation. This event is offered at the college level as well as in some high school regions.

== Individual-events tournaments ==
Individual-events tournaments usually last for six to twelve hours to complete, with the longest tournaments lasting several days. Tournaments have preliminary rounds, followed by "outrounds" - octafinals, quarterfinals, semifinals, and final rounds for each event.

A speech round consists of performances by five to eight competitors, who are then ranked by a judge. Competitors from the same school usually do not compete against each other in preliminary rounds, and are identified by an alphanumeric code to prevent bias by judges.

In a round, a competitor earns points for themselves and their team according to their ranking by a judge. The top competitors from each team in each event score points. At the awards ceremony, medals or trophies are given to individuals and team awards are given to the teams with the most points.
