= David H. Burton =

American historian and academic

David Henry Burton was an American historian and professor of history at St. Joseph’s University in Philadelphia, Pennsylvania.

== Life and education ==
Burton was a World War II combat veteran in the Army's 334th Infantry and was awarded both the Purple Heart and the Bronze Star.

After the war, he earned a degree in history from University of Scranton, before earning both an MA and a PhD in history from Georgetown University. He joined the faculty of St. Joseph's University in 1953 where he taught for over 50 years and chaired the history department for 24 years.

== Career and legacy ==
A historian of American presidents and the Progressive Era, Burton wrote over 17 books, including biographies of Theodore Roosevelt, William Howard Taft, Oliver Wendell Holmes Jr. and Clara Barton. In his work, he argued for a cross-cultural approach to the study of American history, often contextualizing notable historical figures in American history via their contemporaries.

During his career, Burton was awarded fellowships by the American Philosophical Society and the Earhart Foundation and was also a Winston Churchill Traveling Fellow of the English-Speaking Union. His edited volume, American history--British historians: a cross-cultural approach to the American experience, was nominated for a Pulitzer Prize in 1976, and his book, The Learned presidency: Theodore Roosevelt, William Howard Taft, Woodrow Wilson, was named one of the outstanding academic books of 1988 by a division of the American Library Association.

St. Joseph's University established the David H. Burton Postdoctoral Fellowship in recognition of his contribution to the History department over his 50 years as a professor there.

David Burton is the father of the noted historian of British history and empire, Antoinette Burton.

== Selected books ==
- 1968. Theodore Roosevelt: Confident Imperialist, University of Pennsylvania Press
- 1972. Theodore Roosevelt. New York: Twayne Publishers.
- 1973. Theodore Roosevelt and his English correspondents: a special relationship of friends. Philadelphia: American Philosophical Society.
- 1977. Saint Joseph's College: a family portrait, 1851-1976. Philadelphia: Saint Joseph's College Press.(With Frank Gerrity).
- 1978. American history--British historians: a cross-cultural approach to the American experience. Chicago: Nelson-Hall.
- 1979. Oliver Wendell Holmes, what manner of liberal? Huntington, N.Y.: R. E. Krieger Pub. Co
- 1986. William Howard Taft, in the public service. Malabar, Fla: R.E. Krieger Pub. Co.
- 1989. The Learned presidency: Theodore Roosevelt, William Howard Taft, Woodrow Wilson. Rutherford [etc.]: Fairleigh Dickinson University Press.
- 1990. An Anglo-American Plutarch. Lanham, Md: University Press of America.
- 1995. Clara Barton: in the service of humanity. Westport, Conn: Greenwood Press.
- 1997. Theodore Roosevelt, American politician: an assessment. Madison, N.J.: Fairleigh Dickinson University Press.
- 2007. Animating history: the biographical pulse. Philadelphia, Pa: Saint Joseph's University Press.
