= Bruno E. Jacob =

American debate professor

Bruno E. Jacob

Bruno Ernst Jacob (September 9, 1899 – January 5, 1979) was a professor at Ripon College in Wisconsin and founder of the National Forensic League. He served as the league's executive secretary from 1925 until his retirement in 1969.

== Early life and education ==
Jacob was born in Valders, Wisconsin, the youngest of four boys. He graduated from Manitowoc High School in 1918 and earned a B.A. in economics from Ripon College in 1922. He was a founding member of Phi Kappa Pi, a local fraternity at Ripon College. After graduation, he taught social studies at Ripon College and coached debate at Chippewa Falls High School. Later, he taught as an assistant professor of speech at Ripon College.

As a college student, Jacob compiled a vest-pocket handbook entitled Suggestions for the Debater, which achieved national circulation. This handbook led indirectly to the founding of the National Forensic League in 1925.

== National Forensic League ==
From 1925, the National Forensic League became the dominant interest in Jacob's life. In the early years, his concern was to keep the League alive, but by 1969, when he retired, the concern had become that of trying to hold the number of chapters down to 1200 and at the same time adequately serve the affiliated schools. Because of the demands of the league activities, Jacob resigned his teaching position at Ripon College in 1950 in order to devote himself full-time to the League, visiting about 45 states a year. In 1953 the volume of work created by the expansion of the League required the addition of another full-time staff member and a third member was added a few years later. Prior to these additions, Jacob had managed the entire business of running this national organization with nothing more than part-time office help from students at Ripon College and some volunteer help from members of his family.

Upon his retirement in 1969, the League presented him with a new automobile and a trip around the world.

In 1978, Jacob named the first eleven members of the National Forensic League Hall of Fame. At this same event, the league inducted Jacob by acclamation.

The Bruno E. Jacob Award is given at the close of each National Forensic League tournament to the participating school that has accumulated the largest number of tournament points throughout the school year.

== Lifelong traveler ==
During his years as executive secretary, Jacob typically traveled about 20,000 miles a year, mostly by car since he enjoyed driving. Most of this was before the days of interstate highways, and even when they became available he normally would avoid the interstates in favor of the more scenic state highways and back roads.

Beginning in 1946, Jacob decided to visit every county seat in every state, and to document his accomplishment he mailed himself a postcard from each one. It took him almost 25 years, but by 1970 he had been to all 3,100 counties and collected a postcard from each one complete with a postmark noting when he visited.

When asked why anyone would attempt such a project, he replied, "I love to travel, but it's no fun without a destination." Over the years he drove well over 1,000,000 miles. In just the first six years of his retirement, he put almost 300,000 miles on the car he had been given as a retirement gift.

In addition to traveling around the United States, his journeys took him to the western European countries, Australia, New Zealand, and parts of Africa.
