= Extemporaneous speaking =

Type of speech

Extemporaneous speaking (extemp, or EXT) is a speech delivery style used in specific forensics competitions. The competitive speech event is based on research and original analysis performed with limited preparation; in the United States, these competitions are held for high school and college students.

During an extemporaneous speech competition, participants prepare for thirty minutes on a question related to current events and then give a seven-minute speech responding to that question. This delivery style, often referred to as "off-the-cuff," is a method where a speech is prepared and practiced but not memorized.

The style is considered to have elements of two other types of speeches: the manuscript (written text that is read or memorized) and the impromptu (making remarks with little to no preparation). While a search for "extemporaneous" often yields "impromptu" as a synonym, this is not true for speech delivery styles. Unlike an impromptu speech, an extemporaneous speech is planned and practiced. However, it is not read word-for-word during the presentation; instead, speakers will normally rely on brief notes or outlines with key points. This delivery style is highly recommended because audiences perceive it as more conversational, natural, and spontaneous, and it will be delivered in a slightly different manner each time because it is not memorized.

== Strategies for extemporaneous speaking ==
Extemporaneous speakers may find it difficult to make the delivery organized, conversational, and responsive within the assigned context and to an audience. An extemporaneous speech requires that the speaker use a limited number of notes and avoid a memorized presentation. The speaker should practice and rehearse as needed to become familiar with the subject and deliver the speech using their own words and in a conversational style, which engages the audience, while good organization allows for greater understanding of the topic. It is recommended that speakers practice multiple times well in advance of the event, replicating the speaking event as closely as possible (using presentation aids and technology, including an audience, the size of the room, microphone, etc.), to ensure familiarity and make adjustments. Practicing the speech aloud is more effective than practicing silently.

Creating an outline helps speakers remember the structural order, difficult pronunciations, and the main topics of the presentation. An outline used for an extemporaneous speech can be called a "working outline" and it consists of three main sections: the introduction, body, and conclusion. Transitions are used to connect the introduction to the body and one main point to the next.

In the introduction, the successful speaker will gain the audience's attention, establish credibility, state the relevancy of the topic to the audience, and clearly state the thesis and main points. In the body, the speaker elaborates the main points and give supporting evidence, such as facts, statistics, examples, etc. Writing down authors' names, qualifications, publication sources, and dates is useful for sharing accurate citations with the audience. The same techniques are used to outline the conclusion: end on a strong note, leave an impact on the audience, and make it clear what the listeners should take away from the presentation. Speakers can opt to have a simpler outline, with just topics and subtopics or have a more detailed outline with complete sentences and notes that they would otherwise find difficult to remember.

There are other verbal and nonverbal actions that can help when delivering a speech, in any style, to help make an audience perceive the speech more favorably. Keeping eye contact can gain credence and shows confidence and knowledge of the topic being presented. Pronunciation, diction, and articulation can also improve the audience's trust and belief in the speaker. In addition, speakers should also stand up, move, and use gestures, as to be more engaging.

Successful speakers will pace themselves: if talking too fast, the audience might not understand everything being said, but talking too slowly might cause the audience to lose interest. Varying the pace of speech, as well as volume and pitch can help in engagement and keeping attention. A monotone presentation is likely to be perceived as boring and hold less attention from listeners. Asking for feedback from friends and family before the real presentation may be useful to get an opinion on how the speaker is doing and things to improve; some speakers find value in recording their practice speeches for self-critique.

== Format of the event ==
=== Structure of a speech ===
A successful extemporaneous speech begins with an introduction that is usually structured as a 1-minute, 30-second section. Competitors conclude their introduction by providing a basic overview of the structure of the speech, including the question, an umbrella answer (sometimes called a thesis), and a preview of the areas of analysis.

An individual point in extemporaneous speaking is typically structured like a basic paragraph, with a claim, warrant, and impact that collectively take up 1 minute and 30 seconds. Each point usually incorporates two to three sources to build credibility and provide information for analysis, and a mix of both broad argumentation and specific examples. Finally, the end of a point usually links back to the speaker's answer to the question, which functions as an impact. Some schools of thought argue that the impact of a point should link to a scenario outside the scope of the question, but most competitive circuits in high school and collegiate competition value a link back to the answer to the question instead.

The conclusion, which lasts between 30 seconds and 1 minute, follows the basic format of the introduction in reverse order, starting with the speaker restating the question, the answer, and the review of the three main areas of analysis. Finally, the speech finishes with a "clincher"—a rhetorical tool that leaves an audience with something to think about.

=== Delivery ===
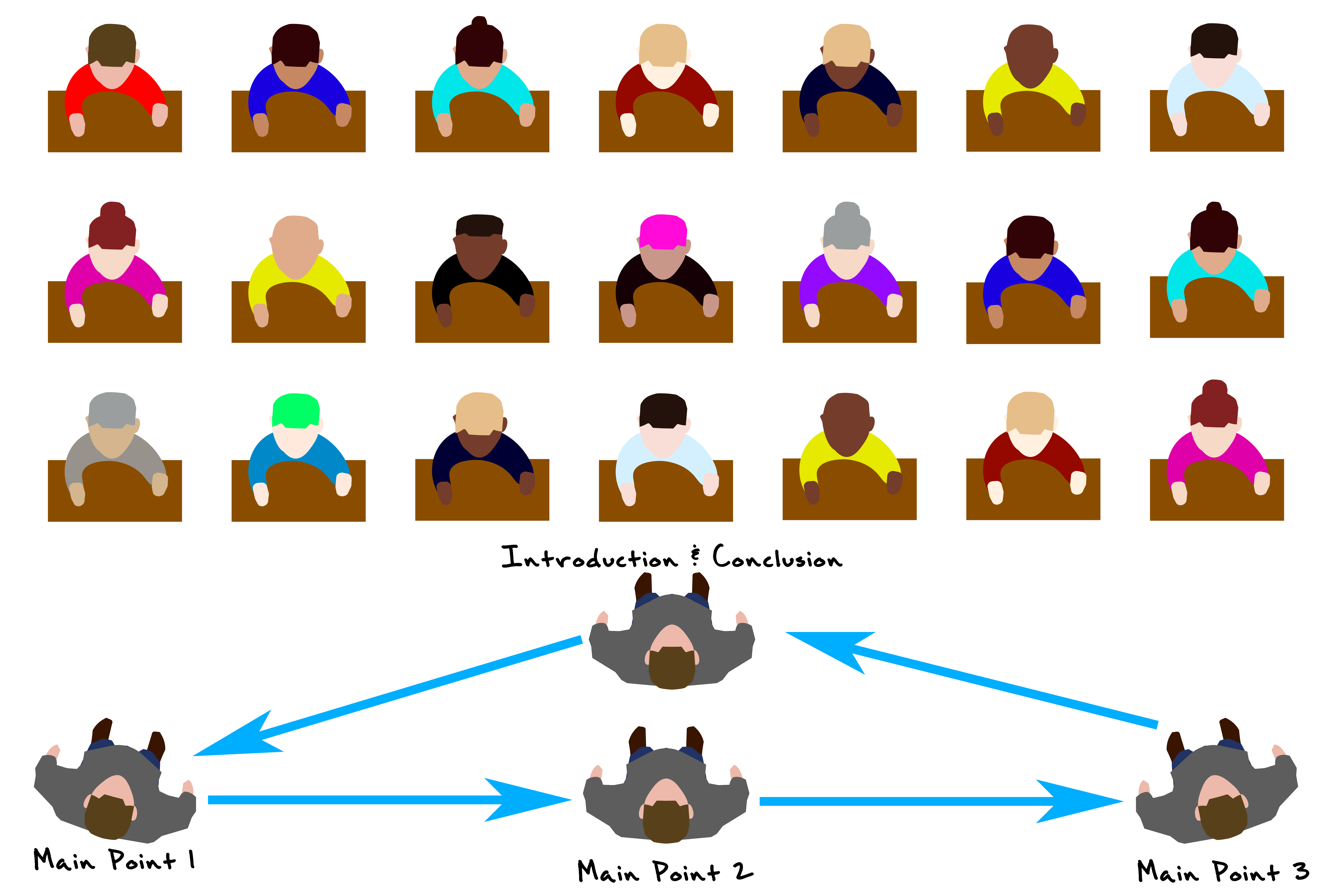
A diagram of the standard Speaker's triangle often used in an extemporaneous speech

During a speech, the "speaker's triangle" is fairly common. In it, a competitor stands in the middle of the stage for the introduction, walks to the left for their first point, moves back to the middle for their second point, walks to the right for their third point, and walks to the middle (and sometimes forward) for their conclusion.

In addition, using body language, such as posture and hand movements, is an important part of the event and many judges consider nonverbal communication as well as the structure of the speech.

Extemporaneous speaking sometimes allows for the use of index cards, but many competitors forgo their usage as they hinder effective delivery, and most leagues do not allow them outside of novice competitions.

=== Preparation ===
In preparing an extemporaneous speech, competitors consult a variety of sources and attempt to make an outline for their speech. Before personal computers, teams would bring packets of citations with them around the country, but now, most competitors elect to store their sources on a laptop computer. However, the use of the internet was prohibited until fairly recently, when many competitions started to allow it during the COVID-19 pandemic.

=== Types of extemp ===
Some tournaments offer both Domestic (United States) and International Extemp, focusing on issues in the United States and around the world, respectively. However, some tournaments, such as the Tournament of Champions, will choose one, since nationally competitive students are prepared for both.

== Competition ==
During a speech, competitors are evaluated by way of comparison to the other speakers in a "round" of competition. Generally, there are five to seven competitors in a given round. Judges rank all students in a round in order, with the first rank being the best and the worst speaker ranked last (sixth, for example, in a round of six competitors).

In high school competition, the National Speech and Debate Association (NSDA) and the National Catholic Forensic League (CFL) govern most of the Extemp tournaments. However most tournaments are independently held by schools. Both leagues have a national tournament at the end of every year, with the NSDA tournament drawing a larger number of competitors. There is also the Extemporaneous Speaking Tournament of Champions, held each May at Northwestern University, the National Individual Events Tournament of Champions, and the Tournament of Champions at the University of Kentucky. These are widely regarded as the main national tournaments, as competing at any of the above is only possible through qualification at local and national circuit tournaments.

Prestigious national circuit tournaments include the Glenbrooks Tournament in Chicago, the Longhorn Classic at the University of Texas at Austin, the Yale Invitational at Yale University, the Barkley Forum at Emory University, the Berkeley Tournament at the University of California, Berkeley, the Florida Blue Key at University of Florida, the New York City Invitational at Bronx High School of Science, and the Harvard Invitational at Harvard University. There is also a major round-robin, which has the prestige of a championship tournament, held at Montgomery Bell Academy (MBA).

In collegiate competition, a myriad of organizations provide competitions in extemporaneous speaking at the national level. The American Forensic Association (AFA) and the National Forensic Association (NFA) are organizations responsible for extemporaneous speaking at the four-year college level, with the national forensic organization Phi Rho Pi serving the two-year community college level. Other organizations that offer extemporaneous speaking competitions include Pi Kappa Delta, Delta Sigma Rho-Tau Kappa Alpha, and the International Forensic Association. Collegiate competition is almost identical to high school competition, but with most tournaments hosted by universities. The AFA hosts a National Individual Events Tournament (NIET), usually in April. The NFA hosts a separate tournament with easier qualification requirements known as the NFA Nationals. Additionally, collegiate competition consists of dozens of tournaments across the country, such as the Norton Invitational, hosted by Bradley University, and the Hell Froze Over swing tournament.

Most competitions are held in the United States; however, countries around the world have Extemp tournaments.

== Rankings ==
Rankings for High School Extemporaneous Speaking are officially maintained by the National Speech & Debate Association (NSDA), and two community-run organizations: Extemp Central and The Extemper's Bible.

=== National champions ===
In American High School Extemporaneous Speaking, the Montgomery Bell Academy Round Robin, Tournament of Champions, Extemp Tournament of Champions, National Individual Events Tournament of Champions, National Catholic Forensic League (NCFL) Grand National Championship, National Speech and Debate Association (NSDA) National Championship in United States Extemp, and NSDA National Championship in International Extemp are all considered to be national championships or of equivalent level.

The collegiate circuit features two national tournaments through two governing bodies: the American Forensics Association (AFA) and the National Forensics Association (NFA).

In the past, several different organizations tracked and ranked competitors based on the aforementioned national championships and circuit tournaments throughout the season. These former "races"—the NSDA Points Race in Extemp, Extemper's Bible National Points Race, and Extemp Central National Points Race—ranked and tracked competitors throughout the season before crowning a champion at the end of the season. As of 2025, the NSDA Points Race is the only remaining race.

=== 2025–2026 ===
In the 2025-2026 season, Daphne Kalir-Starr (The College Preparatory School, California) won the Montgomery Bell Academy Round Robin, the University of Kentucky Tournament of Champions, and the United States Extemp division of the NSDA National Tournament. Zoe Becker (School Without Walls (Washington, D.C.)) won the NCFL Grand Nationals and the International Extemp division of the NSDA National Tournament. Rohan Dash (Pine View School for the Gifted, Florida) won the Extemp Tournament of Champions at Northwestern University. For the first time in its history, the National Individual Events Tournament of Champions split into two sections. Hudson Turman (Tascosa High School, Texas) won the United States Extemp division, while Claire Liu (Portola High School (Irvine, California)) won the International Extemp division.

=== 2024-2025 ===
In the 2024–2025 season, Waleed Haider (Hendrickson High School, Texas) won the Montgomery Bell Academy Round Robin. Charlotte Reitman (NSU University School, Florida) defended her Tournament of Champions title. Daphne Kalir-Starr (The College Preparatory School, California) won the Extemp Tournament of Champions at Northwestern University. Anwen Williams (Lawrence Free State High School, Kansas) won the National Individual Events Tournament of Champions (NIETOC). Nicholas Zylstra (Eastview High School, Minnesota) won NCFL Grand Nationals. At the NSDA National Tournament, Anthony Babu (Concord-Carlisle High School, Massachusetts) defended his title in International Extemp and won the final round. In United States Extemp, Robert Zhang (Elkins High School, Texas) won the national championship and the final round. The Extemp Central National Points Race crowned Zhang as its champion. Kalir-Starr was second and Haider was third.

On the collegiate circuit, Gursimrat Dahry (University of Minnesota, Twin Cities) won the American Forensics Association's national tournament and the National Forensics Association's national tournament.

=== 2023-2024 ===
In the 2023–2024 season, April Zhang (Neuqua Valley High School, Illinois) won the Montgomery Bell Academy Round Robin. Charlotte Reitman (NSU University School, Florida) won the Tournament of Champions. Sasha Morel (Plano West High School, Texas) won the Extemp Tournament of Champions at Northwestern University. Robert Zhang (Elkins High School, Texas) won the National Individual Events Tournament of Champions (NIETOC), and Amy Cao (Ridge High School, New Jersey) won the NCFL Grand Nationals. Tea Shouldice (Half Hollow Hills High School East, New York) won the NSDA National Championship in United States Extemp. Anthony Babu (Concord-Carlisle High School, Massachusetts) won the NSDA National Championship in International Extemp. The Extemp Central points race crowned Brandon Cheng (Flintridge Preparatory School, California) as its champion. Sruti Peddi (BASIS Scottsdale High School, Arizona) placed second in the points race and Anthony Babu placed third.

On the collegiate circuit, Gustavo Lanz (George Mason University, Fairfax) won the American Forensics Association's national tournament and Gursimrat Dahry (University of Minnesota, Twin Cities) won the National Forensics Association's national tournament.

=== 2022–2023 ===
In the 2022–2023 season, McKinley Paltzik (Phoenix Country Day School, Arizona) won the Montgomery Bell Round Robin, the NSDA National Championship in International Extemp, the Extemp Central Points Race, the Extempers Bible Points Race, and the Extemp Tournament of Champions. Theodore Gercken (The College Preparatory School, California) won the NSDA Points Race in Extemp. Agrim Joshi (Shakopee High School, Minnesota) won the National Individual Events Tournament of Champions. Kyle Letterer (Plano West Sr. High School, Texas) won the NSDA National Championship in United States Extemp.

=== 2021–2022 ===
In the 2021–2022 season, Daniel Kind (Lake Highland Preparatory School, Florida) won the NCFL Grand National Championship, Extemp Central Points Race, Extemper's Bible National Points Race, and the NSDA Points Race in Extemp. McKinley Paltzik (Phoenix Country Day School, Arizona) won the Montgomery Bell Round Robin, the Tournament of Champions, and the NSDA National Championship in International Extemp. Peter Alisky (Smoky Hill, Colorado) won the NSDA National Championship in United States Extemp. Gabriel Bo (Plano West Sr. High School, Texas) won the National Individual Events Tournament of Champions. Cameron Roberts (Jack C. Hays High School, Texas) won the Extemp Tournament of Champions.

=== 2020–2021 ===
In the 2020–2021 season Kay Rollins (The Potomac School, Virginia) won the Montgomery Bell Round Robin, the Tournament of Champions, the National Individual Events Tournament of Champions, and the NSDA Points Race in Extemp. Mukta Dharmapurikar (Durham Academy, North Carolina) won the Extemp Tournament of Champions and the Extemper's Bible National Points Race. Ananth Veluvali (Edina High School, Minnesota) won the NCFL Grand National Championship. Pranav Pattatathunaduvil (Plano West Sr. High School, Texas) won the NSDA National Championship in International Extemp. Laurel Holley (Riverside High School, South Carolina) won the NSDA National Championship in United States Extemp. Due to the COVID-19 pandemic, the Extemp Central National Points Race was not held that season. Extemp Central did not release standings for the 2020–2021 season.
