= Impromptu speaking =

Speech without preparation or predetermination

Impromptu speaking is a speech that a person delivers without predetermination or preparation. The speaker is most commonly provided with their topic in the form of a quotation, but the topic may also be presented as an object, proverb, one-word abstract, or one of the many alternative possibilities. While specific rules and norms vary with the organization and level of competition, the speeches tend to follow basic speech format and cover topics that are both humorous and profound.

== Collegiate impromptu speaking ==
Impromptu speaking is an individual event offered and regulated by both the National Forensic Association (NFA) and the American Forensics Association (AFA), both of whom follow nearly identical formats in proctoring the event. Both organizations provide seven minutes of time to be allocated between speaking and preparation as the speaker sees fit, allow minimal notes (usually a 3"x5" index card) to be used, and provide undisclosed prompts to determine the speech's topic.

While the competitor's success and ranking is ultimately determined by the judge's decision, there are several general criteria that many competitors and judges adhere to:

- Experienced speakers are generally expected to avoid exceeding two minutes of preparation time, with some speakers preferring to use only one minute or less.
- The speaker is to create an interpretation of the prompt and use it to establish an argument/thesis that the speech will support.
- The speaker is heavily encouraged to use examples (e.g. historical events) in the "body" of their speech to support their argument.
- Advanced speakers often use theories in conjunction with examples that illustrate them.
- As with any competitive speech, the speaker is expected to offer a clear and defined structure in their speech.
- Competitors are advised to avoid giving pre-prepared, or "canned" impromptu speeches.

Neither the AFA nor NFA regulate specific speech formats to be used by competitors, however there are two formats that are predominantly used:

Two point format:

I. Introduction (Attention getter, interpretation of prompt, argument/thesis)
II. First main point
   A. Supporting example
   B. Supporting example
III. Second main point
   A. Supporting example
   B. Supporting example
IV. Conclusion

Three point format:

I. Introduction
II. First main point
   A. Supporting example
III. Second main point
   A. Supporting example
IV. Third main point
   A. Supporting example
V. Conclusion

=== Editorial impromptu ===
In 2008, the National Forensic Association introduced a new form of impromptu competition. In this experimental event, students were given a short editorial (ideally 3 to 5 paragraphs) to which they developed a response. Students were allowed nine minutes to divide between preparation and speaking. Speakers were required to speak for at least five minutes. Limited notes, prepared in the round, were permitted. The speech was intended to involve the development of an argument in response to the thesis or opinion shared in a given editorial. The event was offered at the National Championship Tournament only twice. Stan Polit from Northwestern University was the 2009 champion and Joshua Hiew from Northwestern University was the 2011 champion.

== High school competitions ==
Typically in high school speech competitions, a competitor is given 30 seconds to select a topic from a set of topics (usually three). The competitor will then have 5 minutes to compose a speech of five minutes with a 30-second grace period. There is a general outline for impromptu speeches, it is as follows:

1. Introduction/roadmap (1 minute)
2. First section (1 minute)
3. Second section (1 minute)
4. Third section (1 minute)
5. Conclusion (1 minute)

The introduction begins with an attention-getter, the statement of the topic and an outline of the speech. The conclusion is usually like the introduction except backwards, ending with a profound statement, although a lighthearted ending is also accepted. For the three body points, there are many kinds of formats that can be used. For example, if the topic is a quote, a competitor may go over how the quote is true, how the quote is false, and why he or she believes what he or she believes. Other examples are: past, present, future; local, national, international. More advanced speakers will use formats that look deeper into a subject such as: physical, moral, intellectual; books, video, digital (media).

However, many speakers choose not to follow a format at all. That being said, most beginners who fail to follow a solid format often find themselves lost in a jumble of ideas.

Judging usually involves one judge in the preliminary round, one to three judges in the semi-finals/qualifying round, and a panel of three judges in the finals round. Judges look for overall coherency, impact, and confidence, and usually overlook basal errors due to the short preparation time.

== Past champions in impromptu speaking ==
=== Past AFA Champions ===
Year	Competitor	Academic Institution
1979	Dwight Rabuse	Macalester College
1980	Camille Bammes	University of New Mexico
1981	Andy Heaton	Bradley University
1982	Kate Joeckel	University of Nebraska–Lincoln
1983	Bart Coleman	Concordia College
1984	Dave Fowler	George Mason University
1985	Bucky Fay	University of Wisconsin-Eau Claire
1986	Debra Williams	Gonzaga University
1987	David Bickford	Brown University
1988	Cam Jones	Cornell University
1989	Cort Sylvester	Concordia College
1990	Michael Jacoby	Bradley University
1991	Randy Cox	University of Texas at Austin
1992	Joe Kennedy	George Mason University
1993	Mark Price	University of Colorado Boulder
1994	Joe Kennedy	George Mason University
1995	Eric Wolff	Concordia College
1996	Kurtis McCathern	Rice University
1997	Chris Grove	Illinois State University
1998	Amir Brown	Rice University
1999	Julie Bolcer	Seton Hall University
2000	Chris McLemore	Kansas State University
2001	Bryan Gray	University of Texas at Austin
2002	Rob Barnhart	Ohio University
2003	Rob Barnhart	Ohio University
2004	Jackson Hataway	University of Alabama
2005	Stephanie Cagniart	University of Texas at Austin
2006	Stephanie Cagniart	University of Texas at Austin
2007	Jill Collum	University of Texas at Austin
2008	Saeed Jones	Western Kentucky University
2009	Jessica Furgerson	Western Kentucky University
2010	Dan Glaser	Ohio University
2011	Omar Orme	Eastern Michigan University
2012	Dexter Strong	University of Alabama
2013	Harrison Postler	University of Northern Iowa
2014	Andrew Neylon	Ball State University
2015	James Qian	Arizona State University
2016	Nathan Leys	George Mason University
2017	Lily Nellans	Western Kentucky University
2018	Suchinder Kalyan	University of Texas at Austin
2019	Nathan Dowell	Kansas State University
2021	Rahmane Dixon	Western Kentucky University
2022	Anna Kutbay	University of Alabama
2023	Gustavo Lanz	George Mason University
2024	Margot Treadwell	Cornell University
2025	Ishika Bhasin	University of Texas at Austin
2026	Ishika Bhasin	University of Texas at Austin

=== Past NFA Champions ===
Year	Competitor	Academic Institution
1971	Lisa Uhrig	Ball State University
1972	Michael Muth	Ohio University
1973	Jerry Bluhm	Eastern Michigan University
1974	Alberto Coll	Princeton University
1975	Jan Marrow	California State University
1976	Alberto Coll	Princeton University
1977	Butch Maltby	Wheaton College (Illinois)
1978	William Allen Young	University of Southern California
1979	George Denger	Eastern Michigan University
1980	Justin Hughes	Oberlin College
1981	Mary Foersch	University of Virginia
1982	Tom McCarthy	Bradley University
1983	Sam Marcosson	Bradley University
1984	David Alabach	Bradley University
1985	Michell Patrick	La Salle University
1986	Mitchell Fay	University of Wisconsin-Eau Claire
1987	Scott Wilson	University of Minnesota Twin Cities
1988	Cam Jones	Cornell University
1989	Cam Jones	Cornell University
1990	Ed Wisniowski	Illinois State University
1991	Nick Fynn	Ohio University
1992	Ronnie Stewart	Bradley University
1993	Eric Martin	Bradley University
1994	Kevin Minch	Wayne State University
1995	Jeff Archibald	Cornell University
1996	Paul Higday	University of Pennsylvania
1997	Mike Thompson	Miami University
1998	Chris Kristofco	St. Joseph's University
1999	Chris Kristofco	St. Joseph's University
2000	Nathan Mather	Northwestern University
2001	Bryan McCann	Ohio University
2002	Rob Barnhart	Ohio University
2003	Rob Barnhart	Ohio University
2004	Allison Rank	Miami University
2005	A.J. Moorehead	Arizona State University
2006	Saeed Jones	Western Kentucky University
2007	Joelle Perry	Western Kentucky University
2008	Jessica Furgerson	Western Kentucky University
2009	Merry Regan	University of Texas at Austin
2010	Todd Rainey	Western Kentucky University
2011	Shira DeCovnick	Northwestern University
2012	Joshua Hiew	Northwestern University
2013	Andrew Neylon	Ball State University
2014	Patrick Seick	Eastern Michigan University
2015	Paige Settles	Western Kentucky University
2016	Jerome Gregory	Bradley University
2017	Kohinoor Gill	Arizona State University
2018	Annie Schuver	Bradley University
2019	Jordan Auzenne	University of Texas at Austin
2021	Jacob Thompson	George Mason University
2022	Aaron Lutz	Lewis & Clark College
2023	Gursimrat Dahry	University of Minnesota Twin Cities
2024	David Jacobson	University of Minnesota Twin Cities
2025	Gursimrat Dahry	University of Minnesota Twin Cities
2026	Gursimrat Dahry	University of Minnesota Twin Cities

Due to the COVID-19 pandemic, the 2020 tournament was canceled. However, the NFA permitted competitors in their senior year to submit recordings of their speeches for an asynchronous competition. The top performing student in each category was ranked as the Performance of Highest Distinction. The Performance of Highest Distinction in Impromptu Speaking was awarded to Andrew Yohanan from Bradley University.

=== Past NSDA Champions ===
Year	Competitor	Academic Institution
1964	Richard Patterson	Oskaloosa HS, Iowa
1965	James Kay	Fullerton HS, California
1966	Keith Dodds	Antelope Valley HS, California
1967	Michael Biggers	Houston-Memorial, Texas
1968	William Rosenberg	Denver-Washington, Colorado
1969	David Alley	Springfield-Parkview, Missouri
1970	Gene Alesandrini	Pekin HS, Illinois
1971	John Campbell	San Marino HS, California
1972	Roy Osborne	Nashville-Overton, Tennessee
1973	David Miller	Denver-Regis, Colorado
1974	Robert Meadow	Richmond-Kennedy, California
1975	David Burton	San Antonio-MacArthur, Texas
1976	James Attridge	Denver-Regis, Colorado
1977	Denise Antolini	Harbor HS, California
1978	Mary Joekel	Lincoln-Southeast, Nebraska
1979	Bill Frank	Perry HS, Ohio
1980	Beth Barlet	Carthage HS, Missouri
1981	Robert Verchick	Chaparral HS, Nevada
1982	Mary Shamshoian	Clovis HS, California
1983	Paul Mapp	South Eugene HS, Oregon
1984	Susan Foster	Gonzaga Preparatory, Washington
1985	Jon Garcia	Bellarmine Preparatory, California
1986	Elaine Barnett	Fresno HS, California
1987	James Wallace	Leilehua HS, Hawaii
1988	Anne Joseph	Robinson Secondary HS, Virginia
1989	Breean Stickgold	Redlands HS, California
1990	Chris Snowbeck	Wheaton Central HS, Illinois
1991	Samantha Burton	Bakersfield HS, California
1992	Arthur Krause	Polytechnic School, California
1993	Jill Van Pelt	Plano HS, Texas
1994	Chris Walker	Dobson HS, Arizona
1995	Razimera Heywood	Redlands HS, California
1996	Ryan Syrek	Millard-South HS, Nebraska
1997	Barrett Huddleston	Putnam City HS, Oklahoma
1998	Peter Stone	Johansen HS, California
1999	Joe Shapiro	Beaverton HS, Oregon
2000	Bethany Kenny	Neosho HS, Missouri
2001	Lexi Menish	Assumption HS, Kentucky
2002	Georgios Theophanous	Miramonte HS, California
2003	Ron Kendler	Newton South HS, Massachusetts
2004	Megan Loden	Aubrey HS, Texas
2005	Lauren K. Nelson	Wheaton North HS, Illinois
2006	Jessica Furgerson	Sandra Day O’Connor, Texas
2007	Treza Hirsch	Flathead County HS, Montana
2008	Taman Narayan	Leland HS, California
2009	Jessica Petrie	Belleville West HS, Illinois
2010	Adam Conner	Loyola Blakefield HS, Maryland
2011	Alex Daniel	Dobson HS, Arizona
2012	Matt Rauen	Pennsbury HS, Pennsylvania
2013	Alexander Buckley	Downers Grove North HS, Illinois
2014	Michael Everett	Chaminade College Prep, California
2015	Josh Mansfield	Highland HS, Idaho
2016	Jacob Womack	Aberdeen Central HS, South Dakota
2017	Kate Farwell	ILEAD North Hollywood, California
2018	Miles Morton	ILEAD North Hollywood, California
2019	Jocelyn Marks	Theodore Roosevelt HS, Iowa
2022	Chloe Yang	Ridge HS, New Jersey
2023	Kat Northrop	Westridge School, California
2024	Madeline White	Gwynedd Mercy Academy, Pennsylvania
2025	Ciara Oldham	Cookeville High School, Tennessee
2026	Zoya Siddiqui	Downers Grove South High School, Illinois

Due to the COVID-19 pandemic, the NSDA permitted competitors in 2020 and 2021 to submit recordings of their speeches for a Prepared Prompt Speaking competition. In Prepared Prompt, students were given a list of topics prior to the tournament, selected one prompt from the official list, prepared a speech, and submitted it through the recording process. The 2020 champion was Sarah George (Marquette HS, Missouri) and the 2021 champion was Nya Ware (Southland College Prep Charter HS, Illinois).
