= American Forensic Association =

- Abbreviation: AFA
- Formation: December 10, 1949
- Type: Public Speaking
- Purpose: To seek greater understanding of the history and practice of reasoned discourse as a sound basis for public involvement.
- Region served: United States
- Official language: English
- President: Joe Gantt, Lewis & Clark College
- Website: www.americanforensicsassoc.org/

The American Forensic Association is an American organisation which promotes and supports competitive debating and public speaking in high schools and colleges in the United States.

== Members ==
- Cross Examination Debate Association
- National Parliamentary Debate Association
- American Debate Association
- International Debate Education Association

== Publications and research ==
The association publishes several scholarly journals including:

- Argumentation and Advocacy
- The Journal of the American Forensic Association
- The AFA Newsletter

== Collegiate competitions ==
The association holds two collegiate national tournaments annually. The tournaments bring students from across the nation to compete for national championships in both individual events and debate. Students reach the tournaments through a rigorous at-large and district qualification system verified by organizational officers. Since their inception, the tournaments have served hundreds of colleges and universities and thousands of students. The tournaments include:

- National Speech Tournament (commonly known as AFA-NST)
- National Debate Tournament (commonly known as AFA-NDT)

== See also ==
- Competitive debate in the United States

== Bibliography ==
- Hagood, A. D. (1951). The American forensic association in the south. in The Southern Speech Journal, 16(3), 228–229. doi:10.1080/10417945109371177
- Klumpp, J. F. (2000). Organizing a Community and Responding to Its Needs: The First Fifty Years of the American Forensic Association. in Argumentation and Advocacy, 37(1), 12–27. doi:10.1080/00028533.2000.11951653
