= National Forensic Association =

American intercollegiate organization

The National Forensic Association (NFA) is an American intercollegiate organization designed to promote excellence in individual events and debate. Founded in 1971, the NFA National Tournament is dedicated to a full range of literature interpretation, public address, limited preparation, and Lincoln-Douglas debate. The NFA sponsors the NFA National Tournament on an annual basis.

== Lincoln Douglas Debate ==
NFA is unique in its NFA-LD Policy format. High school debate is primarily divided into individual debaters engaged in values-oriented competition or teams of debaters in rapid-paced evidence-based policy analysis. Instead of choosing one of these formats, NFA offers evidence-based policy analysis in one-on-one competition.

=== LD Policy Format ===
At the beginning of each year a topic area and corresponding resolution is voted upon and subject to the entire season's debate. Each round competitors find themselves assigned to affirm or negate the resolution. Rather than affirm general ideas or values, affirmative competitors propose a particular policy to adopt as a representation of the resolution. Negative competitors will generally attempt to either demonstrate a lack of need for that policy or argue that said policy's disadvantages outweigh its benefits.

The first affirmative and negative speeches are constructive speeches, intended to put forth the arguments which will comprise the issues in dispute. A cross-examination period of three minutes follows each of these speeches in order to clarify arguments and gain information relevant to each competitor's position. Each competitor is then given a six-minute rebuttal in which their responses and development of the arguments are finalized. At the end of the round, the affirmative is given one final three-minute speech to review why their plan ought to be passed in support of the resolution. An assigned judge will then cast a ballot to affirm or negate the resolution.

=== Past LD Debate Resolutions ===
Year	Resolution
1990-1991	(Exact resolution not available; it was on Supreme Court justice tenure)
1991-1992	Unknown
1992-1993	Resolved: That the terms of federal legislators should be limited to a specific duration.
1993-1994	Resolved: That the USFG should significantly alter laws for immigration into the US.
1994-1995	Resolved: That the FG should significantly reform the US public welfare system.
1995-1996	Resolved: That participation in one or more of the six principal bodies of the United Nations should be significantly restricted by altering the U.N. charter and/or rules of procedure.
1996-1997	Resolved: that the U.S. Department of Education should require the implementation of more rigorous methods of teacher and/or student performance evaluation in secondary school systems.
1997-1998	Resolved: that the United States federal government should significantly change its foreign policy toward Taiwan.
1998-1999	Resolved: that the US Federal Government should significantly increase its regulation of electronically mediated communication.
1999-2000	Resolved: that the United States federal government should increase restrictions on the development, use, and/or sale of genetically modified organisms.
2000-2001	Resolved: That the United States Federal Government should significantly increase restrictions on civil lawsuits.
2001-2002	Resolved: That the United States Federal Government should significantly alter its policy for combating international terrorism.
2002-2003	Resolved: that the United States Federal Government should significantly increase assistance to United States residents living below the poverty line.
2003-2004	Resolved: that the United States Federal Government should substantially increase environmental regulations on industrial pollution.
2004-2005	Resolved: that the United States Federal Government should significantly reform the criminal justice system.
2005-2006	Resolved: that the United States Federal Government should adopt a policy to increase the protection of human rights in one or more of the following nations: Tibet, Bhutan, Afghanistan, Nepal, Myanmar, Thailand, East Timor, Indonesia, Philippines, and/or Pakistan.
2006-2007	Resolved: that the United States Federal Government should adopt a policy to significantly increase the production of energy from renewable sources.
2007-2008	Resolved: That the United States Federal Government should substantially increase assistance to the Greater Horn of Africa in one of the following areas: economic development, human rights protection, or public health.
2008-2009	Resolved: The United States Federal Government should substantially increase its constructive engagement with Cuba.
2009-2010	Resolved: That the United States Federal Government should substantially reform domestic transportation infrastructure.
2010-2011	Resolved: the United States Federal Government should substantially reform the provision of mental health services to the chronically mentally ill.
2011-2012	Resolved: the United States Federal Government should substantially change its trade policy and/or practices with the People’s Republic of China.
2012-2013	Resolved: the United States Federal Government should substantially increase assistance for organic and/or sustainable agriculture in the United States.
2013-2014	Resolved: The USFG should substantially reform elementary and/or secondary education in the U.S.
2014-2015	Resolved: the United States Federal Government should increase its development of the Earth's moon in one or more of the following areas: energy, minerals, and/or water.
2015-2016	Resolved: the United States Federal Government should substantially increase restrictions on bioprospecting.
2016-2017	Resolved: the United States Federal Government should substantially reduce the role of the United States Southern Command in Latin America.
2017-2018	Resolved: the United States federal government should substantially increase the regulation of state and/or local police misconduct in the United States.
2018-2019	Resolved: the United States federal government should substantially increase actions by United States Cyber Command to prevent complex catastrophe and/or protect critical infrastructure.
2019-2020	Resolved: The United States federal government should implement an energy policy that substantially increases investments in one or more of the following domestic energy sectors: nuclear, hydroelectric, geothermal, wind, solar.
2020-2021	Resolved: The United States federal government should implement immigration reform that removes substantial statutory restrictions on legal immigration into the United States.
2021-2022	Resolved: The United States federal government should substantially curtail its counterterrorism operations in one or more of the following areas: statutory authorization for use of military force, air and/or drone strikes, combat and/or 127e programs.
2022-2023	Resolved: The United States federal government should substantially increase restrictions on political campaigns for public office in one or more of the following areas: political communication, campaign spending, interest groups.
2023-2024	Resolved: The United States federal government should substantially reduce the number and/or role of its nuclear weapons.
2024-2025	Resolved: The United States federal government should substantially increase prohibitions on the development and/or use of artificial intelligence in one or more of the following areas: law enforcement, automation, and/or privacy.
2025-2026	Resolved: The United States Federal Government should substantially increase its military presence and/or scientific exploration in the Arctic or Antarctic.

== Previous National Tournaments ==
=== List of Speech Sweepstakes Champions ===
Year	Pentathlon Champion	Team Sweepstakes
1971	Robert Reider, Ohio University	Ohio University
1972	Jim Molnar, Ohio University	Ball State University
1973	Dave Beal, Ohio University	Eastern Michigan University
1974	Bobbi Rowe, Stetson University	Ohio University (2)
1975	Bobbi Rowe, Stetson University	Ohio University (3)
1976	Irene Ziegler, Stetson University	Eastern Michigan University (2)
1977	Michael Garcia, Eastern Michigan University	Eastern Michigan University (3)
1978	William Allen Young, University of Southern California	Eastern Michigan University (4)
1979	George Denger, Eastern Michigan University	Eastern Michigan University (5)
1980	Jon Capecci, Eastern Michigan University	Eastern Michigan University (6)
1981	Jon Capecci, Eastern Michigan University	Eastern Michigan University (7)
1982	Theresa McElwee, Eastern Michigan University	Bradley University
1983	Mike Jones, Eastern Michigan University	Bradley University (2)
1984	Brad Johansen, Bradley University	Bradley University (3)
1985	John Broer, Miami University	Bradley University (4)
1986	Greg Dolph, Bradley University	Eastern Michigan University (8)
1987	Laura Duncan, Eastern Michigan University	Eastern Michigan University (9)
1988	Brenda Dempsey, Eastern Michigan University	Bradley University (5)
1989	Cam Jones, Cornell University	Bradley University (6)
1990	Stephanie Kaplan, University of Wisconsin-Madison	Bradley University (7)
1991	Karon Bowers, Bradley University	Bradley University (8)
1992	Ronnie Stewart, Bradley University	Bradley University (9)
1993	Jason Berke, Illinois State University	Bradley University (10)
1994	Andy Wood, Berry College	Bradley University (11)
1995	Jason Berke, Illinois State University	Illinois State University
1996	August Benassi, Bradley University	Bradley University (12)
1997	Chris Grove, Illinois State University	Bradley University (13)
1998	Grant Ward, Illinois State University; Brendan Kelly, Eastern Michigan University	Bradley University (14)
1999	Brian Davis, Arizona State University	Illinois State University (2)
2000	Dan Hungerman, Miami University	Illinois State University (3)
2001	Steve Zammit, Cornell University	Bradley University (15)
2002	Eric Long, Bradley University	Bradley University (16)
2003	Meredith Schnug, Miami University	Western Kentucky University
2004	John Coleman, Berry College	Western Kentucky University (2)
2005	A.J. Moorehead, Arizona State University	Bradley University (17)
2006	Paul Davis, Arizona State University	Western Kentucky University (3)
2007	Kashif Powell, Morehouse College	Western Kentucky University (4)
2008	Jessy Ohl, Kansas State University	Western Kentucky University (5)
2009	Joele Denis, Western Kentucky University	Western Kentucky University (6)
2010	Dan Glaser, Ohio University	Western Kentucky University (7)
2011	Jacoby Cochran, Bradley University	Western Kentucky University (8)
2012	Jacoby Cochran, Bradley University	Bradley University (18)
2013	Kaybee Brown, Bradley University	Bradley University (19)
2014	Andrew Neylon, Ball State University	Western Kentucky University (9)
2015	Jerome Gregory, Bradley University	Western Kentucky University (10)
2016	Farrah Bara, University of Texas at Austin	Western Kentucky University (11)
2017	Jerome Gregory, Bradley University	Western Kentucky University (12)
2018	Abigail Onwunali, University of Texas at Austin	Western Kentucky University (13)
2019	Andrea Ambam, Western Kentucky University	Bradley University (20)
2021	Derek Collins, Western Kentucky University	Western Kentucky University (14)
2022	Fernando Cereceres, University of Texas at Austin	Western Kentucky University (15)
2023	Doniven Hill-Bush, Illinois State University	Western Kentucky University (16)
2024	Fernando Cereceres, University of Texas at Austin	Western Kentucky University (17)
2025	Cecilia Alali, Western Kentucky University	Western Kentucky University (18)
2026	Mason Lloyd, Wayne State University	University of Texas at Austin

Due to the COVID-19 pandemic, the 2020 tournament was canceled, resulting in no sweepstakes winners. However, the NFA permitted competitors in their senior year to submit recordings of their speeches for an asynchronous competition. The top performing student in each category was ranked as the Performance of Highest Distinction. Finalists in each category were not publicly ranked but were announced as Performances of Distinction. The Pentathlon award was replaced with the Performer of Highest Distinction award, which Saeed Malami won from Lafayette College.

=== List of Lincoln-Douglas Debate Champions ===
Year	National Champion	Team Sweepstakes
1991	Kevin Minch, Wayne State University	
1992	Cindy Weisenbeck, University of Wisconsin-Eau Claire	Ohio University
1993	Robert Mattingly, Western Kentucky University	Suffolk University
1994	Paul Higday, University of Pennsylvania	Ohio State University
1995	Mary Cunningham, Suffolk University	Western Kentucky University
1996	Robert Mattingly, Western Kentucky University	Western Kentucky University (2)
1997	Scott Smith, Ohio State University	Colorado State University
1998	Mike McDonner, Western Kentucky University	Western Kentucky University (3)
1999	Mike McDonner, Western Kentucky University	Western Kentucky University (4)
2000	Sean Williams, Central Missouri State	Central Missouri State University
2001	Colleen Karpinsky, Saint Anselm College	Missouri Southern State University
2002	Lindsay Marquardt, University of Pennsylvania	Creighton University
2003	Jeremy Hollingshead, Missouri Southern State University	Creighton University (2)
2004	John Henderson, Creighton University	Western Kentucky University (5)
2005	Nick Dudley, University of Missouri	Western Kentucky University (6)
2006	Nick Dudley, University of Missouri	Western Kentucky University (7)
2007	Mike Storey, Creighton University	Western Kentucky University (8)
2008	Spencer Harris, Drury University	Western Kentucky University (9)
2009	Mike Storey, Creighton University	Western Kentucky University (10)
2010	Kaleb Jessee, Western Kentucky University	Western Kentucky University (11)
2011	Sarah Spiker, Western Kentucky University	Western Kentucky University (12)
2012	Alison Stickland, Drury University	Truman State University
2013	Susan Taylor, Western Kentucky University	Western Kentucky University (13)
2014	Spencer Orlowski, Western Kentucky University	Western Kentucky University (14)
2015	Nefertiti Dukes, Western Kentucky University	Western Kentucky University (15)
2016	Alex Glanzman, Kansas City Kansas Community College	Western Kentucky University (16)
2017	John Sahlman & Mark Allseits, Western Kentucky University	Western Kentucky University (17)
2018	Colten White, University of Nebraska–Lincoln	Western Kentucky University (18)
2019	Anthony Survance, Western Kentucky University	Western Kentucky University (19)
2021	Andre Swai, Western Kentucky University	Western Kentucky University (20)
2022	Alex Webb, Lewis and Clark College	University of Nebraska–Lincoln
2023	Nick Wallenburg, University of Nebraska–Lincoln	University of Nebraska–Lincoln (2)
2024	Cade Blenden, Washburn University	Washburn University
2025	Rae Fournier, Western Kentucky University	Western Kentucky University (21)
2026	Quinn Largent, Kansas City Kansas Community College	Western Kentucky University (22)

No team sweepstakes champion was crowned during the 2020 National Championship Tournament. However, The 2020 Performance of Highest Distinction in Lincoln-Douglas Debate was Alex Rivera from Western Kentucky University.

== Members of the NFA Hall of Fame ==
Induction Class	Era	Name	College/University
April 2000	1971-1975	David Beal	Ohio University
April 2000	1971-1975	Greg Denaro	Southern Connecticut State University
April 2000	1971-1975	Jim Molnar	Ohio University
April 2000	1971-1975	Judy Sturgis Hill	Eastern Michigan University
April 2000	1971-1975	Danny Vice	Eastern Michigan University
April 2000	1976-1980	Jon Capecci	Eastern Michigan University
April 2000	1976-1980	Michael Garcia	Eastern Michigan University
April 2000	1976-1980	Theresa McElwee	Eastern Michigan University
April 2000	1976-1980	Donald Smith	Southern Connecticut State University
April 2000	1976-1980	Elighie Wilson	Ball State University
April 2000	1981-1985	Marco Benassi	Bradley University
April 2000	1981-1985	Greg Dolph	Bradley University
April 2000	1981-1985	Sam Marcosson	Bradley University
April 2000	1986-1990	David Bickford	Brown University
April 2000	1986-1990	Sarah Braun	Bradley University
April 2000	1986-1990	Cam Jones	Cornell University
April 2000	1986-1990	Stephanie Kaplan	University of Wisconsin-Madison
April 2000	1986-1990	Kim Roe	Eastern Michigan University
April 2000	1991-1995	Jason Berke	Illinois State University
April 2000	1991-1995	Karon Bowers	Bradley University
April 2000	1991-1995	George LaMaster	Bradley University
April 2000	1991-1995	Kevin Minch	Wayne State University
April 2000	1991-1995	Patrick O'Shaughnessy	Bradley University
April 2000	1996-2000	August Benassi	Bradley University
April 2000	1996-2000	Brian Davis	Arizona State University
April 2000	1996-2000	Matt MacDonald	Bradley University
April 2000	1996-2000	Jill Valentine	Bradley University
April 2001	1976-1980	William Allen Young	University of Southern California
April 2001	1976-1980	Nancy Cartwright	Ohio University
April 2001	1976-1980	Mark Hickman	Marshall University
April 2001	1986-1990	Celeste Devore-Matheson	Illinois State University
April 2001	1991-1995	Mona Dworzak	Illinois State University
April 2001	1991-1995	Stacy Nekula	Illinois State University
April 2001	1996-2000	Chris Grove	Illinois State University
April 2001	1996-2000	Ben Lohman	Bradley University
April 2002	1971-1975	Keith Semmel	Mansfield State College
April 2002	1971-1975	Paul Van Dyne	Penn State University
April 2002	1976-1980	Christina Collier Reynolds	Bowling Green State University/Ohio University
April 2002	1981-1985	J.G. Harrington	Rutgers University
April 2002	1986-1990	Penny Geurink-O'Connor	University of Northern Iowa
April 2002	1986-1990	Joel Schwartzberg	Emerson College
April 2002	1991-1995	Andrew Billings	Indiana University
April 2002	1991-1995	Adam Black	Western Kentucky University
April 2002	1991-1995	Michael Malloy	Saint Joseph's University
April 2002	1991-1995	Andy Wood	St. Petersburg College/Berry College
April 2002	1996-2000	Brendan Kelly	Eastern Michigan University
April 2002	1996-2000	David Lindrum	Berry College
April 2002	1996-2000	Robert Pieranunzi	Indiana University
April 2003	1976-1980	Kenda Creasey Dean	Miami University
April 2003	1986-1990	Liesel Reinhart	University of Colorado Boulder
April 2006	1976-1980	Ray Quiel	Eastern Michigan University
April 2006	1981-1985	Mitchell "Bucky" Fay	University of Wisconsin-Eau Claire
April 2006	1986-1990	Ken Klawitter	Bradley University
April 2006	1991-1995	Rita Rahoi	University of Wisconsin-Eau Claire
April 2008	1981-1985	Tom Doyle	Bradley University
April 2008	1996-2000	Jason Davidson	Bradley University
April 2008	1996-2000	Sarah Meinen Jedd	Bradley University
April 2009	1996-2000	Jaime Riewerts	Bradley University
April 2009	2001-2005	John Coleman	Berry College
April 2009	2001-2005	Aaron Unseth	University of Wisconsin-Eau Claire
April 2010	1976-1980	Meg Langford	George Mason University
April 2010	2001-2005	Rob Barnhart	Ohio University
April 2010	2001-2005	Erin Gallagher Barnhart	Ohio University
April 2010	2001-2005	Bryan McCann	Illinois State University
April 2011	1981-1985	Andrew Heaton	Bradley University
April 2011	1986-1990	Jeff "Shappy" Seaholtz	Eastern Michigan University
April 2011	1986-1990	Tom Zeidler-Adamson	Illinois State University
April 2011	1996-2000	Will Koch	Illinois State University
April 2011	2001-2005	Shannon Maney	Illinois State University
April 2011	2001-2005	Robb Telfer	Illinois State University
April 2012	1996-2000	Justin Zabor	Ohio University
April 2013	2001-2005	Matthew Collie	Minnesota State University-Mankato
April 2013	2001-2005	Eric Long	Bradley University
April 2014	1991-1995	Jeff Archibald	Cornell University
April 2014	1996-2000	Kelly (Lloyd) Adriani	Eastern Michigan University
April 2014	1996-2000	Ryan Hershberger	Eastern Michigan University
April 2014	2001-2005	Nina Brennan	Eastern Michigan University
April 2014	2001-2005	Amber (Neuenschwander) Price	Eastern Michigan University
April 2014	2006-2010	Robert Cannon	Glendale Community College (California)
April 2016	1991-1995	Amy Darnell	Morehead State University
April 2016	1996-2000	Richard Besel	North Central College
April 2016	1996-2000	John Boyer	Otterbein College
April 2016	1996-2000	Shane Mecham	Truman State University
April 2016	2001-2005	A.J. Moorehead	Arizona State University
April 2017	1996-2000	Jim Dobson	Northern Arizona University
April 2017	1996-2000	Heidi Sulzman	Arizona State University
April 2017	2006-2010	Angela Dunk	Illinois State University
April 2017	2006-2010	Annie Kincade	Illinois State University
April 2018	1996-2000	Nelsan Ellis	Illinois State University
April 2018	2006-2010	Carrie Guggenmos	Western Kentucky University
April 2019	1996-2000	Marianne LeGreco	Bradley University
April 2019	2011-2015	Maureen Brothman	Illinois State University
April 2019	2011-2015	Ryan Cashman	Illinois State University
April 2020	1971-1975	Simone “Skip” Kincaid	Glenville State College
April 2020	2001-2005	Alison Fisher Bodkin	Bradley University
April 2020	2006-2010	Dillon White	Northwestern University
April 2021	2001-2005	Ben Jedd	Bradley University
April 2021	2001-2005	Vance Pierce	Bradley University
April 2021	2001-2005	Tomeka Robinson	McNeese State University
April 2023	2001-2005	Robert Imbody	Ohio University
April 2023	2001-2005	Paul Porter	Ball State University
April 2023	2001-2005	Meredith Smith	Miami University
April 2023	2006-2010	Richard Brophy	Eastern Michigan University
April 2023	2006-2010	Stan Polit	Northwestern University
April 2024	2011-2015	Jacoby Cochran	Bradley University
April 2024	2016-2020	Mernine Ameris	George Mason University
April 2024	2016-2020	Kevin Mardirosian	Wayne State University
April 2026	1976-1980	Irene Ziegler	Stetson University
April 2026	2001-2005	Rob Layne	Truman State University
April 2026	2015-2020	Saeed Malami	Lafayette College
April 2026	2015-2020	Craig Heyne	Illinois State University
