= California High School Speech Association =

Speech and debate organisation in California

Official logo of the California High School Speech Association

The California High School Speech Association, or CHSSA, is a speech and debate organization offered to all schools in the state of California. It is the governing body for local and state speech and debate competitions in California, with higher-level competition under the auspices of the National Speech and Debate Association and the National Catholic Forensic League, and the Tournament of Champions. The league held its first championship tournament in 1958, and continues to hold championship tournaments every April.

A non-profit, all-volunteer association of over 300 schools throughout the state of California, CHSSA offers a wide variety of resources for teachers, students, and the community to use in the development, implementation and on-going support of speech education and competition for high school students in California.

== Competitive events and rules ==
In order to establish uniform criteria for statewide competitions like the annual California State Championship, the California High School Speech Association (CHSSA) has outlined a selection of events, which are elaborated upon below. While the majority of California leagues choose to align with CHSSA regulations, this adherence is not mandatory unless participating at a State Qualifying Tournament in spring. In the spirit of preserving regional independence, there are instances where CHSSA regulations diverge from the national rules set forth by the National Speech and Debate Association.

The California High School Speech Association offers the following events:

=== Debate ===
Debate requires individuals or student teams to skillfully persuade a judge that their stance on a resolution or topic holds greater validity as a fundamental principle. Participants delve deep into their research, gaining comprehensive insights into both sides of the issue, and honing their ability to critically analyze every potential argument from each perspective.

- Policy Debate (TM/ CX)
- Lincoln-Douglas debate format (LD)
- Public Forum Debate (PF)
- Congressional Debate (CONG)
- Parliamentary Debate (PRL)

=== Speech ===
Speech competitions typically involve one student (or in the case of Duo Interpretation, two students) delivering presentations, which are evaluated alongside similar presentations from other participants in a round. These competitions generally fall into two categories: original events, spontaneous events, and interpretive events. Original or spontaneous events revolve around speeches created by the students. These speeches can address questions, express personal beliefs, persuade the audience, or educate on various subjects. Students may prepare these speeches in advance or with limited time for preparation. Interpretive events involve students selecting and performing pre-existing published material. These events are particularly appealing to individuals who enjoy acting and theatre.

==== Original events ====
- Original Oratory (OO)
- Original Prose & Poetry (OPP)
- Informative Speaking (INFO)
- Original Advocacy (OA)

==== Spontaneous events ====
- International Extemporaneous (IX)
- National Extemporaneous (NX)
- Impromptu (IMP)

==== Interpretation events ====
- Duo Interpretation (DUO)
- Dramatic Interpretation (DI)
- Humorous Interpretation (HI)
- Program Oral Interpretation (POI)
- Declamation (DEC)

== CHSSA leagues ==
CHSSA divides the state of California into four areas and eleven leagues of competition, based on region. Any school can become a member of CHSSA, and its ability to compete in league tournaments is determined by school location.

=== Area 1 ===
- Golden Gate Speech Association (GGSA) - includes the counties of Alameda, Contra Costa, Del Norte, Humboldt, Lake, Marin, Mendocino, Napa, San Francisco, Siskiyou, Solano, Sonoma and Trinity.
- Coast Forensic League (CFL) - includes the counties of Monterey, San Benito, San Mateo, Santa Clara, and Santa Cruz.

=== Area 2 ===
- Capitol Valley Forensics League (CVFL) - includes the counties of Butte, Colusa, El Dorado, Glenn, Lassen, Modoc, Nevada, Placer, Plumas, Sacramento, Shasta, Sierra, Tehama, Yolo, and Yuba
- Southern Valley Forensics League (SVFL) - includes the counties of Fresno, Inyo, Kern, Kings, Madera, and Tulare
- Yosemite Forensics League (YFL) - includes the counties of Alpine, Amador, Calaveras, El Dorado, Mariposa, Merced, San Joaquin, Solano, Stanislaus, and Tuolumne

=== Area 3 ===
- Tri-County Forensics League (TCFL) - includes the counties of Los Angeles (partial), San Luis Obispo, Santa Barbara, and Ventura.
- Southern California Debate League (SCDL) - includes the county of Los Angeles (east)
- Western Bay Forensics League (WBFL) - includes the county of Los Angeles (west)

=== Area 4 ===
- Orange County Speech League (OCSL) – includes the county of Orange
- Citrus Belt Speech Region (CBSR) – includes the counties of Kern (partial), Los Angeles (partial), Riverside, and San Bernardino
- San Diego Imperial Valley Speech League (SDIVSL) – includes the counties of San Diego and Imperial

== See also ==
- Competitive debate in the United States
