= Long Island Forensic Association =

Non-profit organization

- Type: Nonprofit organization
- Headquarters: Nassau County and Suffolk County
- Key people: Lydia Esslinger, President; Brother John McGrory, Treasurer
- Website: http://www.lifa.org/

The Long Island Forensic Association is a non-profit organization which directs high school competitive speech events. It is a daughter league of the New York State Forensics League (NYSFL).

It is co-affiliated with the Long Island chapter of the National Catholic Forensic League (CFL).

The word "forensic" is an adjective meaning "of public debate or argument." The word is derived from the Latin word forensis, meaning "of the forum." The sense of the word "forensic" that means "pertaining to legal trials" dates from the 17th century (Oxford English Dictionary) and led to the use of the word "forensics" in reference to legal evidence.

== Events ==
Each year, LIFA hosts speech, congress, and debate tournaments for honors in a wide variety of events which may lead to qualification for the New York State Championship tournament. These events include:

- Lincoln-Douglas Debate (LD)
- Public Forum Debate (PF) (Ted Turner Debate)
- Extemporaneous Speaking (EXT)
- Original Oratory (OO)
- Declamation (DEC)
- Dramatic Interpretation (DI)
- Humorous Interpretation (HI)
- Duo Interpretation (DUO)
- Oral Interpretation (OI)
- Program Oral Interpretation (POI)
- Student Congress (Congress)

== See also ==
- New York State Forensics League (NYSFL)
- National Catholic Forensic League
