= Florida Forensic League =

Florida Forensic League Logo

The Florida Forensic League, Inc., or FFL, is a speech and debate organization offered to all schools in the state of Florida. It is the governing body for local and state speech and debate competitions in Florida, with higher-level competition under the auspices of the National Forensic League and the National Catholic Forensic League. The league was officially incorporated by the State of Florida on November 20, 2003, and began operations on January 1, 2004, although it existed some time before then in an unorganized fashion. Competitors in the league have been extremely successful at national tournaments.

== Officers ==
The officers of the Florida Forensic League are:

- President - Carol Cecil
- Vice President, Operations - Paul Gaba
- Vice President, Communications - Brian McCanich
- Vice President, Middle School - Bo Lint
- Treasurer - Grant Chmielewski
- Secretary - Jacob Abraham
- New Team Support Specialist - Justin Weaver
- Region 1 Director - Ashley Carter
- Region 2 Director - David Camous
- Region 3 Director - TBD
- Region 4 Director - Quentin Scruggs
- Region 5 Director - Kate Hamm
- Region 6 Director - Sarah Botsch-Mcguinn
- Region 7 Director - Melissa Losure

== Events Sponsored ==
The Florida Forensic League offers the following events:

- Policy Debate
- Lincoln-Douglas Debate
- Public Forum Debate
- After Dinner Speaking
- Duo Interpretation
- Dramatic Interpretation
- Humorous Interpretation
- Student Congress
- Original Oratory
- International Extemporaneous
- Domestic Extemporaneous
- World Schools Debate

The Florida Forensic League also offers Group Interpretation at the regional qualifying tournaments and the Varsity State Championship. Declamation is also offered at the Novice State Championship.

== Districts ==
The Florida Forensic League divides the state of Florida into six regions:

- Panhandle - includes the counties of Escambia, Santa Rosa, Okaloosa, Walton, Holmes, Washington, Bay, Jackson, Calhoun, Gulf, Gadsden, Liberty, Franklin, Leon, Wakulla, Jefferson, Madison, Taylor, Lafayette, Hamilton, Suwannee, Columbia, Baker, Union, Bradford, Nassau, Duval, Clay, and St. Johns.
- Timacuan - includes the counties of Alachua, Putnam, Flagler, Marion, Volusia, Seminole, Lake, Orange, Brevard, Polk, and Osceola.
- Gulf Coast - includes the counties of Dixie, Gilchrist, Levy, Citrus, Hernando, Pasco, Pinellas, Hillsborough, Manatee, Sarasota, Hardee, DeSoto, Charlotte, and Lee.
- Macaw - includes the counties of Indian River, Okeechobee, Highlands, St. Lucie, Martin, Glades, Hendry, and Palm Beach.
- Art Deco - includes the counties of Monroe and Dade.
- Hurricane - includes the counties of Collier and Broward.

== Qualifying ==
To compete at the Varsity State Championship, competitors must place in the qualifying range for their district. The number of qualifiers per event is determined in proportion to the membership of each region.

To compete at the Novice State Championship, competitors must:

- Be in grades 6–12.
- Have fewer than 25 NFL Points at the start of the current school year.
- Have competed in less than three tournaments during the previous school year.
- Have never competed in the Novice State Championship before.

== Championship tournaments ==
The Florida Forensic League offers two state championships every year: a Varsity State Championship, which is open to all competitors who qualify; and a Novice State Championship, which is open only to novices.

The 2019–2020 Varsity State Championship was held February 29 and March 1 at Olympia High School in Orlando.
The 2019–2020 Novice State Championship was scheduled to be held April 4 and April 5 at Cypress Bay High School in Florida but was cancelled due to concerns over the coronavirus outbreak.
The 2020-2021 Varsity State Championship was held March 6 & 7 2021 Virtually on Speechwire.
The 2020-2021 Novice State Championship was held April 10 & 11 Virtually on Speechwire.
The 2021-2022 Varsity State Championship was held March 5 & 6 at Apopka High School
The 2021-2022 Novice State Championship was held April 9 & 10 at Cypress Bay High School
The 2022-2023 Varsity State Championship was held March 4 & 5 at Dr. Phillips High School

== LD Varsity Championship Winners and runner ups ==
- 2017: David Min - American Heritage; Stephen Scopa - Pembroke Pines Charter High School
- 2018: Julia Wu & Ari Azbel - Lake Highland Prep (Close out)
- 2019: Ethan Massa - West Broward High; Elijah Pitt - Ft Lauderdale
- 2020: Roberto Sosa - Cardinal Gibbons High School; Mariana Colicchio - Pembroke Pines Charter High School
- 2021: Emilin Mathew - American Heritage Broward; Prateek Seela - Lake Highland Prep
- 2022: Roberto Sosa - Cardinal Gibbons High School; Sebastian Frazier - NSU University School
- 2023: Ayman Badawy - Lake Highland Prep; Bryce Ownby - Olympia High School
- 2024: Harris Layson & Suchita Vennam - Lake Highland Prep (Close out)
