= Texas Forensic Association =

- Type: Non Profit Organization
- Founded: 1972
- Headquarters: Texas
- Key people: Gay Hollis, Perry Beard, Wendi Brandenburg, Jason Warren, Davy Holmes
- Website: texasforensicassociation.com

The Texas Forensic Association (TFA) is an organization that provides and regulates competition in speech and debate (forensics) for Texas high school students. The association authorizes forensics competitions nearly every weekend in Texas for the duration of the forensics season, which lasts from early August until the end of February, with the State competition typically in the first or second week of March.

== Goals ==
The Texas Forensic Association states that its goals are:

- to foster cooperation between the worlds of speech and theatre
- to show the importance of speech and theatre education to the public
- to create a forum to collaborate and solve common problems in the speech and theatre fields
- to forward the standards of the speech and theatre activities
- to promote cooperation and friendship among students and teachers in the organization

== Regions ==
TFA divides Texas into five regions for administrative purposes; there are no regional championship tournaments or limit on number of schools or students to qualify to the state tournament from each region. The regions are divided by area code, and there is a region representative from each region to coordinate the region's activities with the state association.

- Region 1 covers the Texas panhandle, area code 806. The Region 1 representative is Kelsey Vincent of Bushland High School.
- Region 2 covers Northeast Texas, including the Dallas-Fort Worth metro area. The area codes included are 214, 254, 469, 682, 817, 903, 940, and 972. The Region 2 representative is Reggie Chapman of Plano West Senior High School.
- Region 3 covers South Texas, including the San Antonio and Austin metro areas. The area codes included are 210, 361, 512, 830, and 956. The Region 3 representative is Preston Stolte of Winston Churchill High School.
- Region 4 covers East Texas. It is the smallest region and mainly encompasses the Houston metro area. The area codes included are 281, 409, 713, 832, 936, and 979. The Region 4 representative is Ian Etheridge of Jersey Village High School.
- Region 5 covers West Texas, area code 915, 432, and part of 325. It is the largest geographical region, spanning close to 550 miles across. The Region 5 representative is Yolanda Silva of Franklin High School.

== Events offered ==
=== State qualifying events ===
- Policy Debate (Cross-Examination, CX, Policy): Debate between two teams of two students on a question of policy, which remains the same for the competitive season
- Lincoln-Douglas Debate (LD, Value Debate): Debate between two students on a question of values or morality, which changes every two months
- Public Forum Debate (PF, Ted Turner Debate, Puff, PoFo): Debate between two teams of two students in which each team accepts or rejects a position
- Foreign Extemporaneous Speaking (Foreign Extemp, FX): A 7-minute extemporaneous speech on a foreign current events topic
- Domestic Extemporaneous Speaking (Domestic Extemp, DX): A 7-minute extemporaneous speech on a domestic current events topic
- Original Oratory (Oratory, OO): A 10-minute memorized speech on a topic of the student's choosing
- Informative Speaking (Informative, INFO, INF): A 10-minute memorized speech on a topic of the students choosing with the help of non-electric visual aids
- Humorous Interpretation (Humorous, Humor, HI): A 10-minute memorized humorous presentation of a published work
- Dramatic Interpretation (Dramatic, DI): A 10-minute memorized dramatic presentation of a published work
- Duet Acting (Duet, DA): A 10-minute scene from a published work, presented by a team of two students
- Duo Interpretation (Duo): A 10-minute memorized presentation of a published work, presented by a team of two students
- Congressional Debate (Congress, Student Congress): A mock congress session where students make speeches and motions on a set of given legislation
- World Schools Debate (WS, WSD): A style of debate popular in Australia and Asia, where teams of 3-5 debate upon a set of given motions, which center around principled value and practicality

=== Non-qualifying events ===
These events are held during the TFA State Consolation Rounds.

In addition to the events that can qualify a student to the State Tournament, some tournaments also offer:

- Prose Interpretation: A 7-minute non-memorized presentation of a published piece of prose
- Poetry Interpretation: A 7-minute non-memorized presentation of a published piece of poetry
- Impromptu Speaking: A 5-minute impromptu speech on one of three topics, usually including pop culture references/ more lighthearted options that the other speaking events.

== State Tournament ==
The competitive season culminates in the TFA State Tournament, a three-day event held at a different Texas school each year. Competition in all qualifying events is offered, and non-qualifying events are offered as consolation events for students who did not advance in the event they qualified in.

- The 2008 TFA State Tournament was held March 6–8 at Coppell High School, Dallas, Texas.
- The 2009 TFA State Tournament was held March 5–7 at Cypress Ranch High School, in Houston, Texas.
- The 2010 TFA State Tournament was held March 10–13 at Hanks High School in El Paso, Texas.
- The 2011 TFA State Tournament was held March 10–12 at Flower Mound High School in Flower Mound, Texas
- The 2012 TFA State Tournament was held on March 1–3 at Amarillo High School in Amarillo, Texas.
- The 2013 TFA State Tournament was held on March 7–9 at South Grand Prairie High School in Grand Prairie, Texas
- The 2014 TFA State Tournament was held on March 6–8 at Cypress Creek High School in Houston, Texas
- The 2015 TFA State Tournament was held on March 5-7 at Franklin High School in El Paso, Texas
- The 2016 TFA State Tournament was held on March 10-12 at Hendrickson High School in Pflugerville, Texas
- The 2017 TFA State Tournament was held on March 9-11 at Plano West Senior High School in Plano, Texas
- The 2018 TFA State Tournament was held on March 1-3 at La Vernia High School, La Vernia Junior High School, La Vernia Intermediate School, La Vernia Primary School in La Vernia, Texas
- The 2019 TFA State Tournament was held on March 14-16 at Alief Taylor High School in Houston, Texas (Region 4).
- The 2020 TFA State Tournament was held March 5-7 at Franklin High School in El Paso, Texas (Region 5).
- The 2021 TFA State Tournament was held March 10-13 through a virtual learning campus.
- The 2022 TFA State Tournament was held March 9-12 at Gregory-Portland High School in Portland, Texas (Region 4).
- The 2023 TFA State Tournament was held in March at the Marriott Westchase hotel in Houston, Texas (Region 4).
- The 2024 TFA State Tournament was held in March, again at the Marriott Westchase hotel in Houston, Texas (Region 4).
- The 2025 TFA State Tournament was held in March at Jordan High School in Houston, Texas (Region 4).
- The 2026 TFA State Tournament was held in March at Rock Hill High School in Prosper, Texas (Region 2)

=== Points system ===
To qualify for State in a certain event, a student must accumulate fourteen state points in the event. Points are awarded based on the number of entries in the tournament.

Cross Examination Debate, Lincoln-Douglas Debate, and Public Forum Debate
- 10-15 entries: Semis gets 2 points, 2nd Place gets 4, and 1st Place gets 6
- 16-50 entries: Quarters gets 2, Semis gets 4, 2nd Place gets 6, and 1st Place gets 8
- 51-75 entries: Octos gets 2, Quarters gets 3, Semis gets 6, and 1st/2nd Place gets 8
- 76 + entries: Double-Octos gets 1, Octos gets 2, Quarters gets 4, Semis gets 6, and 1st/2nd Place gets 8
Individual Events (including Duo/Duet)
- 10-24 entries: 1st Place gets 6, 2nd Place gets 4, 3rd Place gets 3, 4th Place gets 2, 5th/6th Place gets 1 point
- 25-50 entries: 1st Place gets 8, 2nd Place gets 6, 3rd Place gets 4, 4th Place gets 3, 5th Place gets 2, 6th Place gets 1 point
- 51-75 entries: 1st/2nd Place gets 8, 3rd/4th Place gets 6, 5th Place gets 4, 6th Place gets 3, 7th Place gets 2, 8th Place gets 1 point
- 76 + entries: 1st/2nd Place gets 8, 3rd/4th Place gets 6, 5th Place gets 4, 6th Place gets 3, 7th/8th Place gets 2, any and all semifinalists get 1 point
Congressional Debate
- 10-25 entries: 1st Place gets 6, 2nd Place gets 4, 3rd Place gets 3, 4th Place get 2, and 5th/6th Place gets 1
- 26-50 entries: 1st Place gets 8, 2nd Place gets 6, 3rd/4th Place gets 4, 5th-8th Place gets 2
- 51-75 entries: 1st/2nd Place gets 8, 2nd/3rd Place gets 6, 5th-8th Place gets 3, 9th-16th gets 2
- 76 + entries: 1st/2nd Place gets 8, 2nd/3rd Place gets 6, 5th-8th Place gets 4, 9th-16th gets 2, all semi-finalists get 1

=== Scholarship ===
The TFA awards a scholarship of $500 or $1,000 to two male and two female students each year at the state tournament. Any state-qualified senior may apply with a recommendation from his or her coach. The awards are given based on an equally weighted consideration of achievements, financial need, and academics.
