= FFL =

FFL may refer to:

== Entertainment ==
- Fanie Fourie's Lobola, a 2013 South African film
- Fantasy Football League, a former British television program
- The Final Fantasy Legend, a handheld role-playing game for the Game Boy
- "FFL", a song by Foo Fighters on the album Five Songs and a Cover

== Military ==
- Forces françaises libres (the Free French Forces), active during the Second World War
- French Foreign Legion, a wing of the French Army

== Sport ==
- FAO Football League, in Odisha, India
- First Federal League, a football league in Yugoslavia
- Flemish American Football League, a Belgian American football league
- Freedom Football League, an upcoming American sports league

== Photography ==
- Fixed focal length (FFL), alternatate term for a prime lens
- Flange focal length
- Front focal length

== Other uses ==
- French as a foreign language
- Fear Factor Live, a live stunt show based on the Fear Factor TV series
- ﬄ, a typographic ligature; see List of XML and HTML character entity references
- Fairfield Municipal Airport (Iowa), in the United States
- Federal firearms license, for firearms dealers and manufacturers in the United States
- Feminists for Life, an American anti-abortion organization
- Fit for Life, a dieting book series
- Flavorite Ice Cream, an ice cream manufacturer in Trinidad and Tobago
- Florida Forensic League, an American high school debate organization
- Focal fatty liver
- Food for Life (disambiguation)
- Fossil Fuel Levy, in the United Kingdom
- Foundation for Feedback Learning, now Ganas, an intentional community in the U.S. city of New York
- Friends for Life (disambiguation)
- Friedman Fleischer & Lowe, an American private equity firm
- Fucked For Life, a Swedish gang
