= J.W. Patterson Tournament of Champions =

High school debate tournament

The University of Kentucky J.W. Patterson Tournament of Champions (TOC, UKTOC, or TOC-UK) is a national high school speech and debate tournament held by the University of Kentucky College of Communications and Information every year in a weekend in April. The UK Tournament of Champions is considered to be the national championship of the “National Circuit", and is one of the most prestigious and competitive American high school speech and debate tournaments. The TOC currently holds competition in Policy debate, Lincoln–Douglas debate, Public Forum debate, Congressional Debate, World Schools Debate, Extemporaneous Speaking, Original Oratory, Informative Speaking, Dramatic Interpretation, Duo Interpretation, Humorous Interpretation, Oral Interpretation, and Program Oral Interpretation.

The Tournament of Champions is operated independently by the University of Kentucky. Nevertheless, The Tournament of Champions uses the rules and regulations provided by the National Speech and Debate Association (NSDA), including resolutions or topics for many events.

The UKTOC is not to be confused with the National Individual Events Tournament of Champions (NIETOC), which is a speech only tournament with similar qualification as the Kentucky tournament. While both prestigious, the UKTOC is generally considered notable for debate, while the NIETOC is seen as more difficult for speech.

== History ==
=== Origins ===
The National Tournament of Champions was conceived in 1972 by Dr. J.W. Patterson, Professor of Speech and Communications and Director of Debate at the University of Kentucky from 1960–2010. Patterson previously coached high school policy debate at Muskogee Central High School in Oklahoma before joining the University of Kentucky. However, when considering the need for another national championship tournament, concluded that major national tournaments in the early 1970s had three problems: quality of judges, internal politics and long lag times. Thus, Patterson created the tournament with the hope that his competition would redress the issues with other national championships. In its initial (1972) competition, the Tournament of Champions was positively received by highly regarded policy debate teams and continued to become more influential and popular in successive tournaments.

=== Advisory Committee ===
After the first eight tournaments, Patterson recognized that the "national circuit" influence of the tournament required that the event adapt. Consequently, Patterson began to formalize a system of "Tournament of Champions Advisory Committees," encouraging coaches to give feedback and suggestions. However, while the committee informally began in 1980, official formal committees were not established until 1990.

=== Addition of Other Events ===
One major development in the Tournament of Champions' structure was the addition of Lincoln Douglas Debate. "LD" first appeared at the National Forensic League National Championship in 1980, but was not included in TOC until 1986. Despite Patterson's efforts to include the event as early as 1983, strong opposition from the Advisory Committee prevented Patterson from adding Lincoln-Douglas until 1986.

The next event added to the annual Tournament of Champions competition was Public Forum Debate. However, unlike Lincoln-Douglas Debate which boasted support by its proponents for inclusion in the Tournament of Champions, Public Forum Debate faced strong opposition to joining TOC competition from supporters and opponents of the event alike. Ultimately, it was introduced in 2004 as a round robin. In 2007, the round robin format was abolished.

Beginning with the 2004–2005 school year, Congressional Debate was added to the TOC. Notable champions include Gregory Bernstein, who was the first and only competitor to win the tournament twice (doing so in 2012 and 2013) and Will Mascaro, who won by the largest margin since the event was added.

In 2012, the Tournament of Champions added two Speech Round Robins—in Extemporaneous Speaking and Original Oratory. In 2012 and 2013, admission to the Round Robins was by application. For 2013–2014, invitations to compete in the two Round Robins was extended to the finalists of a number of strong national and regional tournaments. In 2015, the Tournament of Champions abolished the round robin format.

== Tournament procedure ==
=== Qualification ===
The Tournament of Champions uses a bid system, in which placing high enough in certain nationally or regionally respected tournaments earns debaters a bid, with at least 2 bids needed to compete. Some popular bid tournaments include Greenhill (TX), Harvard (MA), and UC Berkeley (CA). In addition to attaining 2 bids, competitors can automatically qualify by placing high enough at last year’s Tournament of Champions (or one of the two other national tournaments). Or, if they do not automatically qualify or earn 2 bids, they may be accepted as an "at-large entry", where they must apply to receive a bid after the season finishes. At-large entries need to attain one bid and have made it to many "bid rounds," the round before a team would receive a bid, to be considered for an at-large entry.

The number of bids allotted in each tournament depends on the type of event, the number of entries in an event, and the tier the tournament is given. Tier 1 tournaments give the least amount of bids, whilst tier 4 tournaments give the most bids. Additionally, for Public Forum, bids are divided into silver and gold bids. The silver division for Public Forum is hosted online, and the Gold division is hosted in person.

=== Elimination procedure ===
In Lincoln-Douglas debate and Policy debate, the Tournament of Champions has seven preliminary rounds and clears to double-octafinals. All entries who won at least 5 prelim rounds have the opportunity to advance into the outrounds.

Congressional Debate and Speech, employs the National Circuit's standard way of advancing. Competitors are placed in rooms, where they have several opponents and are ranked against one other. The top competitors after preliminary rounds advance to an elimination round determined by entry numbers.

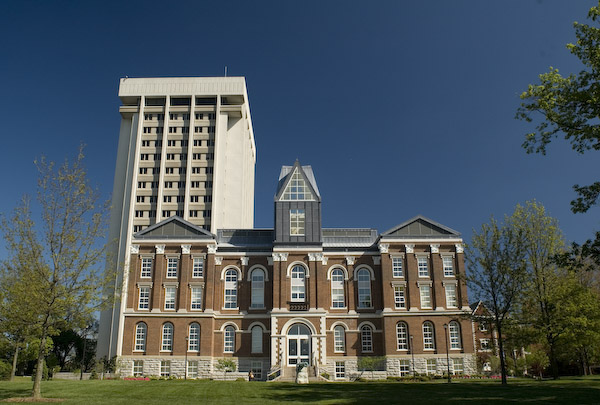
The Main Building in the foreground and the Patterson Office Tower in the background.

=== Location ===
Since its inception, the Tournament of Champions has been held on the campus of the University of Kentucky and at other locations in Lexington, Kentucky near the campus.

Currently, preliminary rounds of Lincoln-Douglas, Policy, Public Forum, and Congress are held directly at the University of Kentucky. However, after the competition on Saturday and Sunday, the tournament moves to a central location to conduct its annual "Breakfast of Champions" ceremony as well as the elimination rounds. Since the 2007 Tournament of Champions, the final day of competition has taken place in conference rooms at the Downtown Hilton in Lexington, Kentucky.

During the COVID-19 pandemic, the Tournament of Champions moved online for 2020 and 2021.

== Other awards ==
=== Julia Burke award ===
The Julia Burke Award is presented each year, in memory of Julia Burke, a debater at The College Preparatory School who was killed in a car crash in 1998. The purpose of this award is to recognize a "policy debater who achieves competitive excellence in high school policy debate on the national circuit, and who demonstrates goodness of heart despite the pressures of competition at the highest level." The award is accompanied by a $1000 scholarship and $1000 to donate to a charity of the recipient's choice. Nominations can be submitted by any debater attending the Tournament of Champions. They are then narrowed to a list of three or four debaters by a selection committee chosen by the Julia Burke foundation. The winner is chosen by a vote of all the attendees and coaches at Tournament of Champions.

== Tournament of Champions in popular culture ==
The Tournament of Champions was both a prominent subject and setting for the 2007 HBO documentary Resolved. Director Greg Whiteley initially followed the policy debate team of Sam Iola and Matt Andrews of Highland Park High School throughout their season until their loss in semifinals of the 2005 Tournament of Champions. After the defeat, Whiteley focuses the film's attention on the pursuit of qualifying to the tournament by the Long Beach Jordan team, which presents a kritik in an attempt to be successful and reform debate practices. While the film shifts focus to the Long Beach Jordan pair, it still makes mention near the end of the film that Matt Andrews (then with Greenhill School) won the 2006 Tournament of Champions without losing a ballot, taking first place with a ballot record of 22-0 (the second team to do so, Pace Academy (Allen/Smith) being the first in 2002).

== See also ==
- Lincoln Douglas Debate
- Policy Debate
- Public Forum Debate
- Congressional Debate
- World Schools Debate
