= Stoa USA =

Christian homeschool forensics organization in the United States

- Type: Non Profit Organization
- Founded: 2009
- Key people: Scott York, Founding President; Dorr H. Clark, Founding Debate Chair; Lynda Sloneker, President; Lars Jorgensen, Founding Member
- Website: www.stoausa.org

Stoa USA, also referred to as Stoa, is a Christian homeschool forensics organization in the United States. It is one of the four major national high school forensics organizations: the others are the National Speech and Debate Association (NSDA), National Catholic Forensic League (NCFL), and the National Christian Forensics and Communications Association (NCFCA).

Stoa is defined by the Merriam-Webster Dictionary as “an ancient Greek portico usually walled at the back with a front colonnade designed to afford a sheltered promenade.” The Stoa was a common fixture of many towns in Ancient Greece and was used as a place where people could debate and discuss their ideas.

== Overview ==
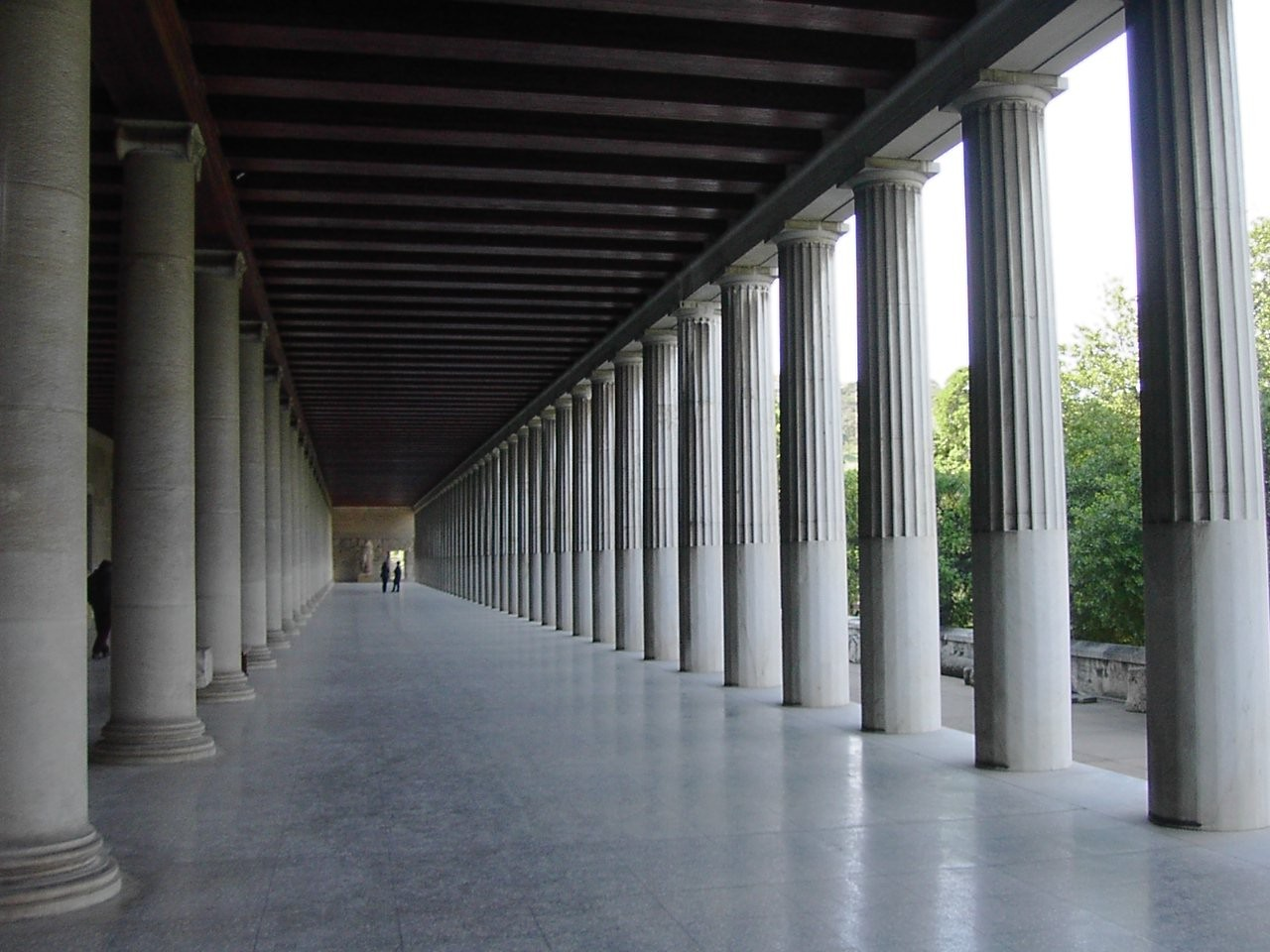
A stoa in Athens. Stoa USA derives its name from this common feature of Ancient Greek architecture.

Stoa was created in 2009 to serve the needs of the growing homeschool speech and debate community. Its website explains that its objective is “to train Christian home schooled youth in speech and debate in order to better communicate a Biblical worldview.”

Stoa USA is a non-profit organization run entirely by volunteers. It is governed by a board of directors who oversee its day-to-day operations and propose rule amendments which affect competitors nationwide. Members vote on important issues, such as debate resolutions and significant rule changes. Judges are usually parents, coaches, alumni, or members of the community.

Stoa sanctions only one tournament each year, the National Invitational Tournament of Champions (NITOC) (referenced below). Stoa exists to support state and local organizations in running tournaments, but recognizes the autonomy of those at the state and local level to operate in a manner that best serves their particular needs. Many locally-run tournaments attract hundreds of Stoa competitors each year, such as the one typically held in the spring at Concordia University in Irvine, CA.

Because homeschooled students are not typically associated with schools, most affiliates belong to member “Clubs.” Most club members live in the local area around where their club is based.

Logo of Stoa USA, 2012–2016

== Point Recognition System ==
The National Christian Homeschool Speech and Debate Rankings, also known as Speechranks, was a comprehensive website that ranks Christian homeschooled speakers and debaters around the country who are in high school or middle school. Speechranks was created in 2010 for promoting transparency and fairness in the Christian homeschool forensics community. As of October 2025, Speechranks.com has been discontinued for the 2025–2026 season and replaced by StoaHub.com, a website that combines registration and rankings together. Results from Stoa tournaments are uploaded to the ranking database by tournament administrators. The website is monitored to ensure the integrity of the information entered. Viewers may also “Flag” results they believe to be in error. According to its website, there were 1,716 active competitors on Speechranks during the 2024–2025 season.

There are two ways that Stoa measures student participation: Points and Green Check Marks. Points are awarded to competitors based on the student's percentile finish in each event. Students achieving the same percentile finish in any event and any tournament will be awarded the same number of Points. A student's three best finishes in a particular event are used to sum their total Points for that event. Overall ranking on Speechranks is determined by the total number of Points a competitor has accumulated. Green Check Marks recognize consistent excellence throughout the competitive season. There is no limit to the number of Green Check Marks a student may earn. In general, Green Check Marks are awarded to any competitor who achieves a top 38% finish in debate or finishes in the top 40% of an individual event (IE). The only exception to this is impromptu speaking, which requires a top 25% finish as of the 2023–2024 season. Green Check Marks are unique to each event and students may not transfer checkmarks from one event to another.

== National Invitational Tournament of Champions [NITOC] ==
Each year in late May or early June, the Stoa Board of Directors hosts the National Invitational Tournament of Champions, commonly referred to as NITOC. The process of qualification involves being awarded at least two Green Check Marks on Speechranks in one or more events. Participation at NITOC requires Stoa membership. Students may compete in as many events at NITOC in which they are invited by either of the two invitational models. The 2012 National Invitational Tournament of Champions, held in Colorado Springs, Colorado, was regarded as the largest tournament in the history of homeschool speech and debate, where nearly 600 students competed across 13 different events.

=== Locations ===
- 2024: Union University, Jackson, Tennessee
- 2023: Concordia University Irvine, Irvine, California
- 2022: Dallas Baptist University, Dallas, Texas
- 2021: Union University, Jackson, Tennessee (Originally intended to be held at Point Loma Nazarene University, San Diego, California, but was relocated to Union University due to uncertainty about the state of California's intense COVID-19 lockdowns)
- 2020: Union University, Jackson, Tennessee (Canceled due to COVID-19)
- 2019: Dallas Baptist University, Dallas, Texas
- 2018: Point Loma Nazarene University, San Diego, California
- 2017: Union University, Jackson, Tennessee
- 2016: Drury University, Springfield, Missouri
- 2015: Bob Jones University, Greenville, South Carolina
- 2014: California State University, San Marcos, California - Due to a wildfire that broke out near the university and the school's subsequent evacuation, this tournament was held in multiple locations across San Diego County including Point Loma Nazarene University and San Diego State University.
- 2013: John Brown University, Siloam Springs, Arkansas
- 2012: Focus on the Family Headquarters, Colorado Springs, Colorado
- 2011: Point Loma Nazarene University, San Diego, California
- 2010: University of San Diego, San Diego, California

== Events ==
=== Debate ===
- Lincoln Douglas Value Debate
- Team Policy Debate
- Parliamentary Debate

=== Speech ===
==== Limited Preparation ====
- Apologetics. "In Apologetics, the competitor is given four (4) minutes to prepare a persuasive and reasoned six (6) minute speech that defends a tenet of the Christian faith and explains why that principle matters."
- Extemporaneous. "In Extemporaneous speaking, the competitor answers a given question based on recent events in the news. The competitor researches national and international current events and may create reference files of newsworthy information. Extemporaneous speech should be regarded as a demonstration of personal knowledge on the topic, as well as an original synthesis of numerous sources."
- Mars Hill Impromptu. "In Mars Hill Impromptu, the competitor uses books, movies, and other genre to discuss the appeal and impact of the theme(s) within the topic, holding them up in light of Christian truth found in the Bible. This event is intended for competitors 14 and older or with the consent of the parents due to mature themes in some topics."
- Impromptu. In 2015 STOA removed Impromptu as a national qualifying event, though some states and tournaments continued to coach and allow impromptu competition. In 2022 it again became a NITOC event. The competitor receives three different topics and must choose one topic to speak about during a two (2) minute prep time. When the prep time expires, the competitor is given a speaking time limit of five (5) minutes.

==== Platform ====
- Expository. "An Expository is a prepared speech written by the competitor which explains and illustrates a topic through both words and visuals (e.g. illustrated boards, physical props, digital and electronic presentations, or any combination)."
- Original Oratory. "An Original Oratory is a prepared speech, written by the competitor, on a topic of the competitor’s choice. The purpose of this informative speech is to explain, describe, or expose the topic."
- Persuasive. "A persuasive speech is a prepared speech, written by the competitor, which advocates a specific position or course of action."

==== Interpretive ====
- Open Interpretation.
- Duo Interpretation
- Humorous Interpretation
- Dramatic Interpretation

==== Wildcard ====
- 2024-2026: Slam Poetry
- 2022-2024: Interp in a Box
- 2019-2022: Oratory Analysis
- 2018-2019: Demonstration
- 2017-2018: Cold Reading, Demonstration
- 2016-2017: Monologue, Cold Reading
- 2015-2016: Motivational, Monologue
- 2014-2015: Broadcasting, Motivational
- 2013-2014: Storytelling, Broadcasting
- 2012-2013: Mars Hill Impromptu, Storytelling
- 2011-2012: Original Interpretation

== Debate Resolutions ==
=== 2026-2027 ===
- Team Policy: Resolved: The U.S. Federal Government should substantially reform its agriculture policy.
- Lincoln-Douglas (Fall 2026): Resolved: Liberty ought to be prioritized over order.
- Lincoln-Douglas (February 1, 2027): Resolved: In regulating emerging technologies, governments ought to prioritize caution over innovation.

=== 2025-2026 ===
- Team Policy: Resolved: The United States Federal Government should substantially reform its policy toward one or more countries in Central/South America.
- Lincoln-Douglas (Fall): Resolved: In foreign policy, diplomacy is more effective than military intervention.
- Lincoln-Douglas (Winter): Resolved: Incrementalism is superior to radicalism as a means to achieve social change.
- Lincoln-Douglas (Spring): Resolved: Practical skills should be valued over theoretical knowledge.

=== 2024-2025 ===
- Team Policy: Resolved: The United States Federal Government should substantially reform its policy on healthcare.
- Lincoln-Douglas (Fall): Resolved: The acquisition of knowledge is an intrinsic good.
- Lincoln-Douglas (Winter): Resolved: Mandatory national service is justified.
- Lincoln-Douglas (Spring): Resolved: In U.S. Law enforcement accountability ought to be prioritized over effectiveness.

=== 2023-2024 ===
- Team Policy: Resolved: The United States Federal Government should substantially reform its energy policy.
- Lincoln-Douglas (Fall): Resolved: A free press ought to prioritize objectivity over advocacy.
- Lincoln-Douglas (Winter): Resolved: National security ought to be prioritized over individual rights.
- Lincoln-Douglas (Spring): Resolved: The letter of the law ought to have priority over the spirit of the law.

=== 2022-2023 ===
- Team Policy: Resolved: The United States Federal Government should substantially reform its policy towards one or more countries in Europe.
- Lincoln-Douglas: Resolved: Criminal justice ought to prioritize rehabilitation over retribution, restitution or deterrence.

=== 2021-2022 ===
- Team Policy: Resolved: The United States Federal Government should substantially reform the use of Artificial Intelligence technology.
- Lincoln-Douglas: Resolved: In the field of biomedical engineering, restraint ought to be prioritized over scientific advancement.

=== 2020-2021 ===
- Team Policy: Resolved: The United States Federal Government should considerably decrease its military commitments.
- Lincoln-Douglas: Resolved: Economic stability is more important than economic growth.

=== 2019-2020 ===
- Team Policy: Resolved: The United States federal government should substantially reform its banking, finance, and/or monetary policy.
- Lincoln-Douglas: Resolved: Culture ought to value assimilation over multiculturalism.

=== 2018-2019 ===
- Team Policy: Resolved: The United States federal government should substantially reform its foreign aid.
- Lincoln-Douglas: Resolved: In criminal procedure, truth-seeking ought to be valued above individual privacy.

=== 2017-2018 ===
- Team Policy: Resolved: The United States federal government should substantially reform its transportation policy.
- Lincoln-Douglas: Resolved: Preemptive warfare is morally justified.

=== 2016-2017 ===
- Team Policy: Resolved: The United States federal government should substantially reform its agriculture and/or food safety policy in the United States.
- Lincoln-Douglas: Resolved: The needs of the public ought to be valued above private property rights.

=== 2015-2016 ===
- Team Policy: Resolved: The United States federal government should substantially reform its trade policy with one or more of the following nations: China, Japan, South Korea, Taiwan.
- Lincoln-Douglas:
  - Resolved: In formal education liberal arts ought to be valued above practical skills. (from October 1, 2015, to January 30, 2016)
  - Resolved: Developing countries ought to prioritize economic growth over environmental protection. (from February 1, 2016, to April 30, 2016)

=== 2014-2015 ===
- Team Policy: Resolved: The United States federal government should substantially reform its electronic surveillance law.
- Lincoln-Douglas:
  - Resolved: When in conflict, an individual's freedom of speech should be valued above a community's moral standards. (from October 1, 2014, to January 30, 2015)
  - Resolved: The United States federal jurisprudence, the letter of the law ought to have priority over the spirit of the law. (from February 1, 2015, to April 30, 2015)

=== 2013-2014 ===
- Team Policy: Resolved: The United States federal government should substantially reform its marine natural resource policies.
- Lincoln-Douglas: Resolved: The United States has a moral obligation to mitigate international conflicts

=== 2012-2013 ===
- Team Policy: Resolved: The United States federal government should substantially reform its foreign military presence and/or foreign military commitments.
- Lincoln-Douglas: Resolved: Privacy is undervalued.

Logo of Stoa USA, 2009–2012

=== 2011-2012 ===
- Team Policy: Resolved: That the United States federal government should substantially reform its revenue generation policies.
- Lincoln-Douglas: Resolved: When in conflict, personal freedom ought to be valued above economic security.

=== 2010-2011 ===
- Team Policy: Resolved: That the United States Federal Government should significantly reform its policy toward Russia.
- Lincoln-Douglas: Resolved: A government's legitimacy is determined more by its respect for popular sovereignty than individual rights.

=== 2009-2010 ===
- Team Policy: Resolved: That the United States Federal Government should significantly reform its environmental policy.
- Lincoln-Douglas: Resolved: That competition is superior to cooperation as a means of achieving excellence.

== See also ==
- National Christian Forensics and Communications Association
- National Forensic League
- National Catholic Forensic League
