= Grand National Tournament =

Grand National Speech and Debate Tournament is the premier public speaking event of the National Catholic Forensic League. It is held annually in the United States over Memorial Day weekend. One can qualify for the tournament by performing sufficiently well in a local qualifying tournament.

== Description ==
The Grand National Speech and Debate Tournament is the premier public speaking event of the National Catholic Forensic League. The event is held annually in the United States of America over Memorial Day weekend. Students can qualify for the tournament by performing sufficiently well in a local qualifying tournament. There are a number of events in which the participants may compete.

== Events ==
=== Declamation ===
Grand National Tournament in Declamation (also known as Oratorical Declamation or Oratorical Interpretation, commonly abbreviated to "DEC") is a public speaking event of the National Catholic Forensic League. The category is almost always open to high school freshmen and sophomores only. It is often used as a "starter" event to get underclassmen used to the speech and debate activity in general and to prepare them for other categories such as Dramatic Performance or Original Oratory.

==== Rules ====
In simplest terms, Declamation is delivering a speech that was already written and delivered by another person. A competitor may choose any speech that has been delivered in public before. NCFL rules call for specific introductory material and a ten-minute time limit. The NCFL is the largest league in the United States that offers Declamation as a category for competition. Most local and state leagues adhere to NCFL rules or slight variations on them.

From the official NCFL critique sheet:

"The speaker should convey the message in a sincere, honest and realistic attempt to recreate the spirit of the original presentation. Although the style of delivery chosen by the speaker should be judged in light of the purpose of the speech, artificiality is to be discredited. The message should be conveyed credibly and convincingly as if the words were the speaker’s own. This event is an interpretation, not an impersonation."

Therefore, the purpose of the category is not to give an impersonation of the original speaker; it is to interpret their words in an interesting and convincing manner that fits the individual competitor. The competitor is only required to recreate the general "feel" of the original delivery, not mimic it.

"The introduction must name the work and author, provide necessary background information and establish the mood."

"The speaker should be physically open to the audience and use body language which
invites the audience into the world of the declaimer. The speaker should vary facial expression
accentuate the natural flow of thoughts and feelings. The speaker should make eye contact with the audience. The speaker’s stance should be erect and controlled, without distracting movements.
If used, movement should be motivated by transitions in thought or mood. Gestures should be visible, effectively
used for emphasis, and varied."

=== The Theodore Gibson Oratorical, Declamation and Advocacy Project ===
A joint venture of Miami Dade College and Miami Dade County Public Schools in Miami, Florida, the Project began in 1977, and is dedicated to exposing school children to the wide breadth of writings about the Black experience throughout the Diaspora. The Project seeks to provide an opportunity for school children in grades Pre-K through high school to discover and refine public speaking skills through a comprehensive and challenging level of learning and competition.

The Project is an in-person oratory, declamation and advocacy oral presentation of persuasive or inspirational material of literary merit prepared by another person; the advocacy component being a researched problem, identified solution, and the extolled benefits or burdens of an issue in an effectively, compelling speech. The speech is memorized and each speaker is allowed a minimum of 3 minutes to present. Judging is based primarily on the quality of the presentation as represented by the following evaluation criteria:

==== Selection ====
  - Intellectual Understanding: Is the structure of the selection conducive to interpretation? Does the speaker demonstrate emotional and aesthetic merit?
  - Historical/Creative Significance: Does the selection represent a thoughtful review of the breadth of African-American, Afro-Caribbean, African, human/civil rights experience, or creativity.

==== Diction ====
  - Vocal Variety/Contrast: Does the voice show variations in rate, speed mood? Were transitions smooth and in keeping with the total message?
  - Tempo: Were time, pauses and hesitations used properly? Were emphasis and subclimaxes acknowledged with associated rapid speech? Was the pace set in keeping with the author's intent?

==== Articulation ====
  - Voice: Was their clearness, correctness, and effectiveness in choice and expression of words?
  - Vocabulary: Did speaker demonstrate a full command of the language of the piece and master complexities of vocabulary, pronunciation and context?

==== Projection Presentation ====
  - Stage Presence: Does speaker manipulate floor space appropriately to dispense the full effect of the selection? Does speaker appear comfortable and well adapted to the space?
  - Animation: Is the presentation performed appropriately to the tone of the selection? Is animation appropriate or overdramatized?
  - Bodily Actions: Do gestures, stance and facial expression support and emphasize the verbal content of the speech, or do they detract and call forth undue attention?

==== Final Evaluation ====
  - Overall Effectiveness: Overall presentation of piece, effectiveness, articulation and stage presence.

The Project's namesake, the Reverend Canon Theodore R. Gibson, a Miami city commissioner known for his oration and vision, made the remark that is the Project's theme: "Help the Children to Communicate...That is the Key".

=== The Original Oratory Controversy ===
The use of former Original Oratory speeches in Declamation has become quite widespread in recent years. Some see this practice as unfair or undermining the category's original purpose, as these speeches were originally written for the purpose of winning in forensic competition, and not necessarily conveying an important message. At the beginning of 2003–2004 season, the NCFL enacted a ban on all former high school competitive oratories, effective as of the 2005 Grand National Tournament. However, at the beginning of the 2004–2005 season, the restriction was removed, and thus, the ban never truly came into effect. State and local leagues may choose to ban or allow material as they wish.

==== Recent National Champions ====
- 1995: Jim Frawley – Holy Ghost Prep – Bensalem, Pennsylvania
- 1997: Lesley Pories – Madison – Arlington County, Virginia
- 1998: Usman Akeju – Iona Preparatory School – New Rochelle, New York
- 1999: Matthew Maalouf – Catholic Memorial H.S. – Boston
- 2000: Heidi Dixon – Plymouth H.S. – Indianapolis
- 2001: Michael Rugnetta – St. Joseph’s Prep – Philadelphia
- 2002: Ben Schwartz – Natick HS – Worcester, Massachusetts
- 2003: Mauricus Lofton – Danville HS – Louisville, Kentucky
- 2004: Sarah Koch – Apple Valley HS – Winona, Minnesota
- 2005: Joe Bittlingmaier – Iona Preparatory School – New Rochelle, New York
- 2006: Sal Zullo – Iona Preparatory School – New Rochelle, New York
- 2007: Victoria Myrthil – St Josephs HS – New York City
- 2008: Davante Lewis – Alfred Barbe High School – Lake Charles, Louisiana
- 2009: Jake Kerrigan – Chaminade HS – Mineola, New York
- 2010: Jhovani Vonleh – Catholic Memorial School – West Roxbury, Massachusetts
- 2011: Hannah Spieldenner – Chanhassen HS – Chanhassen, Minnesota
- 2012: Rose Chrisman – Broad Run HS – Loudoun County, Virginia
- 2013: Patrick Conaway – Natick HS – Worcester, Massachusetts
- 2014: Connor Shea – Natick HS – Worcester, Massachusetts
- 2015: Aiden Bassett – Newton South HS – Newton, Massachusetts
