= Lifa =

Lifa or LIFA may refer to:

- Leeward Islands Football Association, an association of the football playing nations in Leeward archipelago
- Lifa, an album by the folk music band Heilung
- Long Island Forensic Association, a non-profit organization which direct high school competitive speech events
- Djamel Lifa (born 1969), French boxer
- Peng Lifa (born 1974), Chinese physicist and democracy activist
