= Emily Pierpont de Lesdernier =

American novelist (1840–1915)

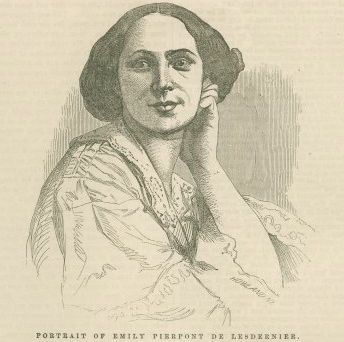
- Born: August 31, 1819; Lubec
- Died: July 23, 1875 (aged 55)
- Occupation: Writer

Emily Pierpont de Lesdernier (31 August 1819 – 23 July 1875) was an American novelist, poet, and dramatic reader.

Emily Pierpont de Lesdernier was born on 31 August 1819 in Lubec. Maine. She was the daughter of Lewis Frederick De Lesdernier, Collector of Customs at Passamaquoddy and member of the Massachusetts General Court (1811–1812). In 1839, she married Asa Tapley Richards and they had three children. Forced to care for her children by herself, she reverted to her maiden name and began writing and performing. Her work as an actress and dramatic reader took her to as far as San Francisco.

Emily Pierpont de Lesdernier died on 23 July 1875 in Boston.

== Bibliography ==
- Voices of Life, 1853.
- Berenice, 1856.
- The autobiography of a married woman, 1859
- Hortense: the Last of a Noble Name: A Romance of Real Life, 1867
- Headland home, or, A soul's pilgrimage, 1868
- Norma Danton: or, The Children of the Lighthouse. A Tale of City Life. 1 vol. London: W. Nicholson & Sons, 1870.
- Fannie St. John: A Romantic Incident of the American Revolution, 1874
