= John Philip Kemble as Cato =

1812 painting by Thomas Lawrence

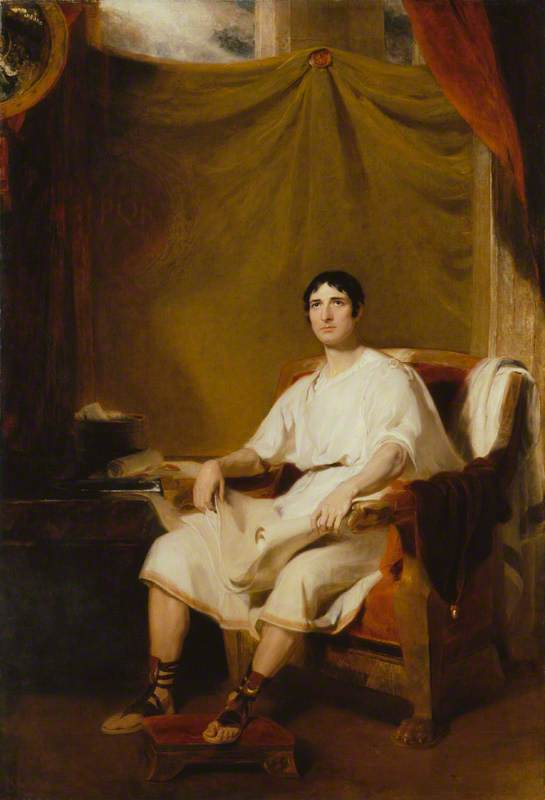
- Artist: Thomas Lawrence
- Year: 1812
- Type: Oil on canvas, portrait
- Dimensions: 267 cm × 182 cm (105.1 in × 71.5 in)
- Location: National Portrait Gallery, London

John Philip Kemble as Cato is an 1812 portrait by the English artist Thomas Lawrence of the actor John Philip Kemble. Part of the Kemble dynasty he was, along with his sister Sarah Siddons, one of the most celebrated actors of the period. Lawrence had established himself as the leading portrait painter of the Regency era and had previously painted Kemble as Hamlet in 1801.

Kemble is shown in the role of Cato from Joseph Addison's 1713 play Cato, a Tragedy. It was exhibited at the Royal Academy's Summer Exhibition. Today it is in the National Portrait Gallery in London having been purchased in 2009 with assistance from the Art Fund and Garrick Club. A 1798 painting by Lawrence John Philip Kemble as Coriolanus is now in the Guildhall Art Gallery.

== See also ==
- Portrait of John Philip Kemble, 1799 painting by William Beechey
- Portrait of Sarah Siddons, 1804 painting of his sister by Thomas Lawrence

== Bibliography ==
- Holmes, Richard. Thomas Lawrence Portraits. National Portrait Gallery, 2010.
- Levey, Michael. Sir Thomas Lawrence. Yale University Press, 2005.
- O'Quinn, Daniel. Corrosive Solace: Affect, Biopolitics, and the Realignment of the Repertoire, 1780-1800. University of Pennsylvania Press, 2022.
- West, Shearer. The Image of the Actor: Verbal and Visual Representation in the Age of Garrick and Kemble. Palgrave Macmillan, 1991.
