= Portrait of Sarah Siddons =

1804 painting by Thomas Lawrence

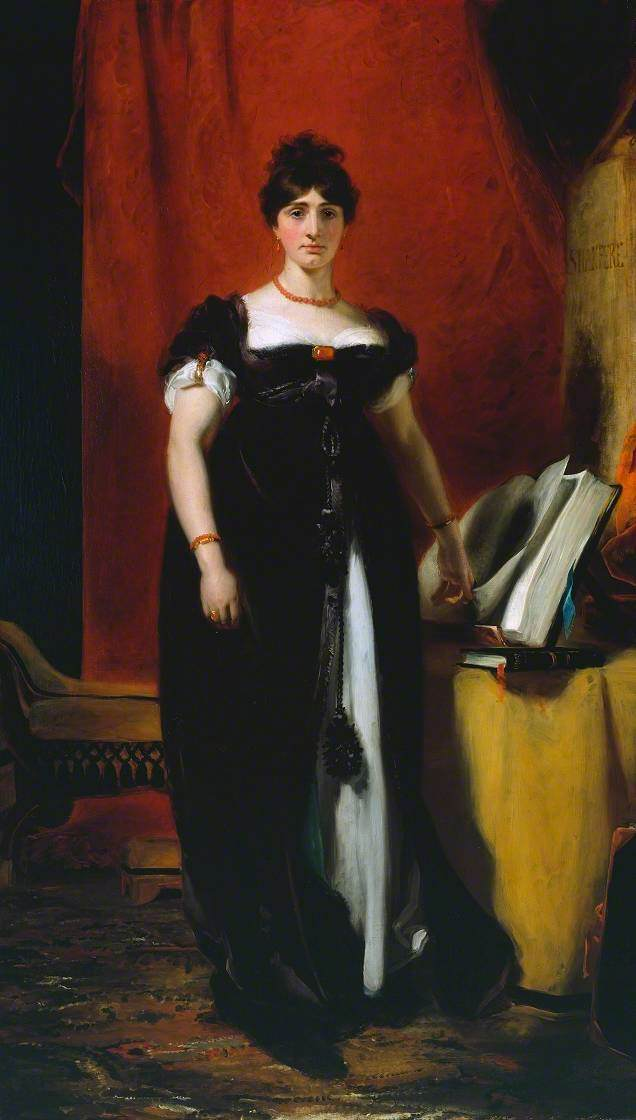
- Artist: Thomas Lawrence
- Year: 1804
- Type: Oil on canvas, portrait
- Dimensions: 254 cm × 148 cm (100 in × 58 in)
- Location: Tate Britain, London

Portrait of Sarah Siddons is an 1804 portrait painting by the English artist Thomas Lawrence depicting the actress Sarah Siddons.

Siddons was the leading tragedienne of the early Regency era. She was a member of the Kemble family of actors, that included her brothers John Philip Kemble and Charles Kemble. Lawrence was romantically involved with two of her daughters and had known her since his days as a child prodigy in Bath.

Lawrence depicts Siddons in full-length during a dramatic reading. She is shown with volumes of plays by Thomas Otway and William Shakespeare.

The painting was commissioned by Charlotte FitzHugh, wife of William FitzHugh MP, and hung at their house Banisters, near Southampton. FitzHugh presented it to the National Gallery in 1843, and today it is in the collection of Tate Britain in London.

== See also ==
- John Philip Kemble as Cato, an 1812 portrait painting by Lawrence of her brother

== Bibliography ==
- Levey, Michael. Sir Thomas Lawrence. Yale University Press, 2005.
- Mole, Tom. Romanticism and Celebrity Culture, 1750-1850. Cambridge University Press, 2009.
- Pascoe, Judith. The Sarah Siddons Audio Files: Romanticism and the Lost Voice. University of Michigan Press, 2011.
