= John Philip Kemble as Coriolanus =

1798 painting by Thomas Lawrence

John John Philip Kemble as Coriolanus
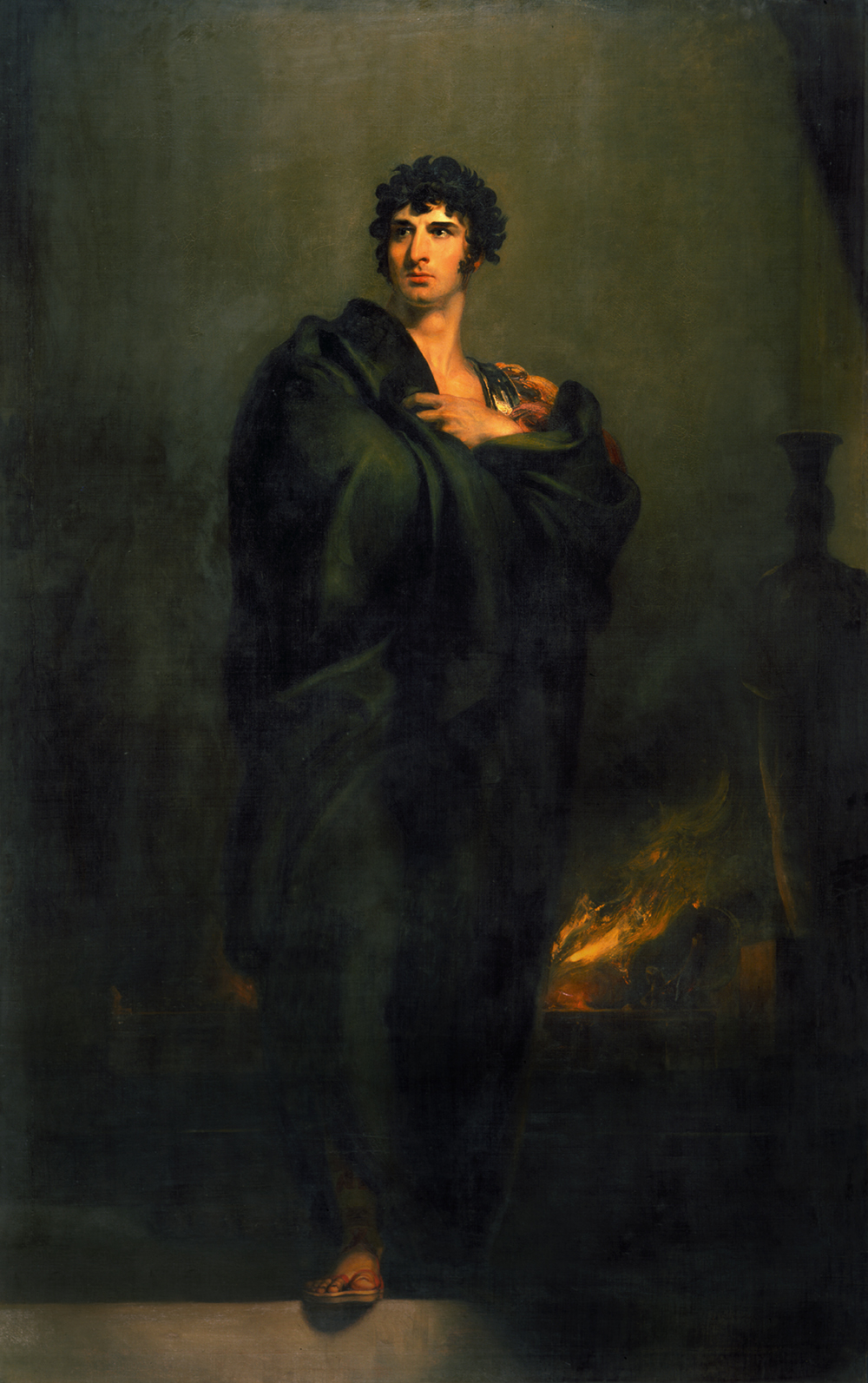
- Artist: Thomas Lawrence
- Year: 1798
- Type: Oil on canvas, portrait
- Dimensions: 387 cm × 179 cm (152 in × 70 in)
- Location: Guildhall Art Gallery, London

John Philip Kemble as Coriolanus is a 1798 portrait painting by the English artist Thomas Lawrence depicting the British actor John Philip Kemble appearing in the role of Coriolanus in the William Shakespeare tragedy of the same title. Kemble was the leading male actor of the era, frequently appearing alongside his sister Sarah Siddons in London's West End. Having first appeared in the part in 1789, it became one of Kemble's greatest roles. It portrays Coriolanus banished from Rome and plotting his revenge. Francis Bourgeois had previously produced the same scene and exhibited it in 1797.

Today it is in the collection of the City of London's Guildhall Art Gallery, having been presented by the Earl of Yarborough in 1906. Lawrence painted Kemble several times, including as Hamlet in 1801. His 1812 work John Philip Kemble as Cato is now in the National Portrait Gallery.

== Bibliography ==
- Levey, Michael. Sir Thomas Lawrence. Yale University Press, 2005.
- Ritchie, Fiona & Sabor, Peter (ed.) Shakespeare in the Eighteenth Century. Cambridge University Press, 2012.
- West, Shearer. The Image of the Actor: Verbal and Visual Representation in the Age of Garrick and Kemble. Palgrave Macmillan, 1991.
