= National Individual Events Tournament of Champions =

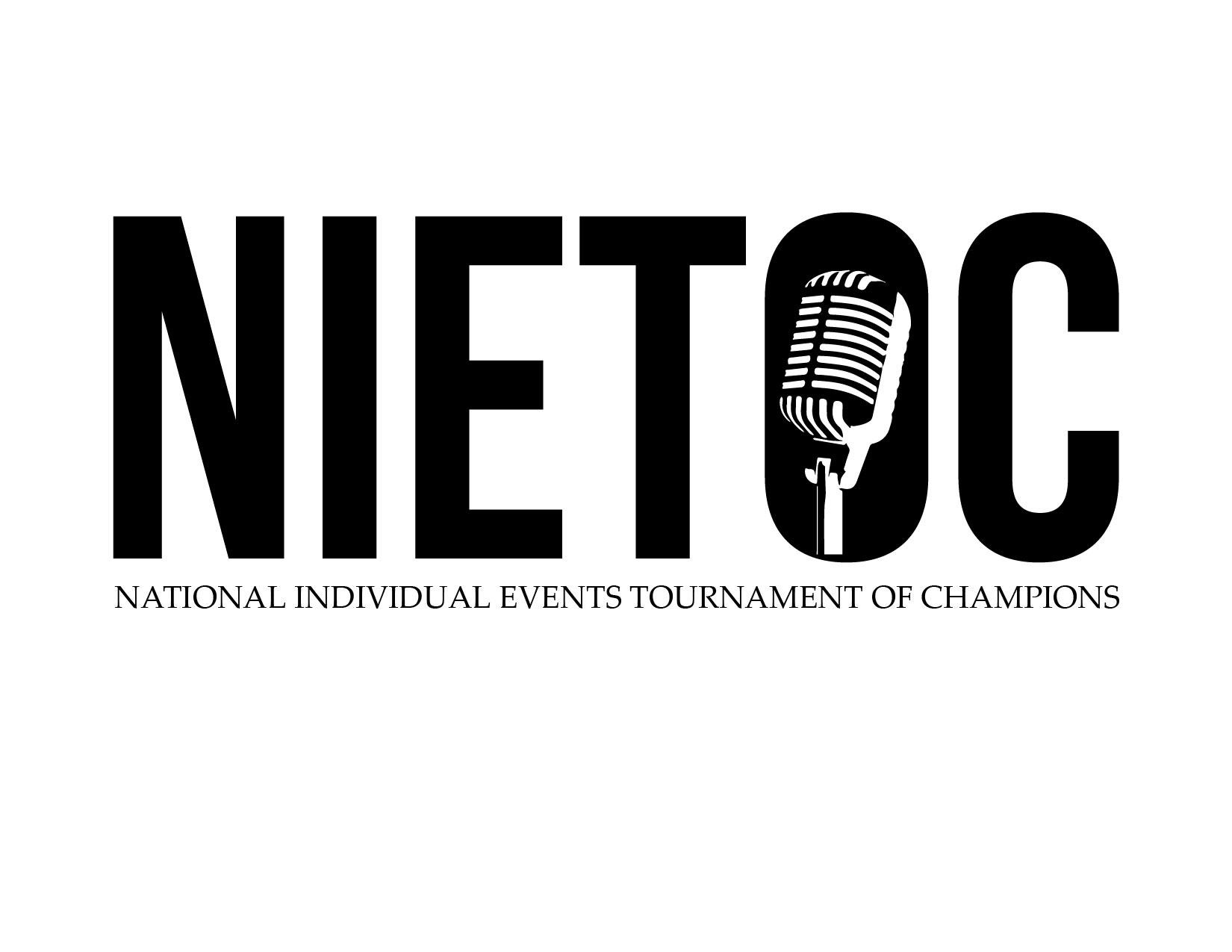
NIETOC Logo

The National Individual Events Tournament of Champions (NIETOC) is a high school speech tournament in the United States. It is often considered the speech equivalent to the University of Kentucky Tournament of Champions (UKTOC). Unlike the UKTOC which offers both events in speech and debate, the NIETOC only offers speech events. It hosts some of the best competitors from the country, and is considered among many to be the most difficult speech tournament in the United States. It is currently headed by Executive Director Dr. Tommie Lindsey.

== Qualification ==
The NIETOC runs on a bid system. A student must receive two bids at an accredited tournament to qualify. Bids are earned by placing near the top of the qualifying tournament pool, but specific bid numbers depend on number of entries to the tournament.

A student can also qualify for the NIETOC by an 'At-large bid', where their 3 best tournament records (bid qualifying or not) add up to a total of 9 or less.

A student can automatically qualify to the NIETOC by placing at semifinals or farther at the previous year's NIETOC or NSDA National Speech and Debate Tournament. Auto-qualifiers are also given to top three placers at state tournaments if the tournament is before March 31.

If a school has had a person qualify to the NIETOC, they can also send two bonus entries in supplemental events.

== Events ==
The NIETOC only offers speech events, with the current roster being

- Original Oratory (OO)
- Informative Speaking (INFO)
- Expository Speaking (EXPO)
- Humorous Interpretation (HI)
- Dramatic Interpretation (DI)
- Duo Interpretation (DUO)
- United States Extemporaneous (USX)
- International Extemporaneous (IX)
- Impromptu Speaking (IMP)
- Poetry (POET)
- Prose (PROS)
- Programmed Oral Interpretation (POI)

Of these, IMP, POET, PROS, and EXPO are considered supplemental events.

== Scholarships and awards ==
NIETOC participants qualify for a scholarship depending on their rank. The champion wins a $750 scholarship, 2nd place gets a $400 scholarship, 3rd gets a $200 scholarship, and 4-6th place gets a $100 scholarship.

Awards are given to those who reach octo-finals or farther in main events, and semi-finals or farther in supplemental events.

=== Perfect Performance Award ===
In addition to event awards, the contestant with the highest points (awarded by highest ranks) wins the Perfect Performance Award in any main event.

=== Encore Team Awards ===
There are 3 sweepstakes awards given to schools, Act I, Act II, and Act III. These are given to the schools with the highest total points.

=== Mrs. Josephine Duke Award ===
An award given to the educator of the year, decided by the NIETOC committee.
