= Food for Life =

Food for Life may refer to:

- Hare Krishna Food for Life, a vegan and vegetarian food relief organization
- Food for Life, a 2005 cookbook by chef Kevin Thornton
- Food for Life, a 1993 book by vegan activist Neal D. Barnard
- Food for Life, a 1952 book by neurophysiologist Ralph W. Gerard

== See also ==
- Jeevanamsam (lit. 'Food for Life'), a 1968 Indian Telugu-language film
- Yummy Yummy, a TV drama jointly produced by Singapore's SPH and Hong Kong's TVB
