= Focal fatty liver =

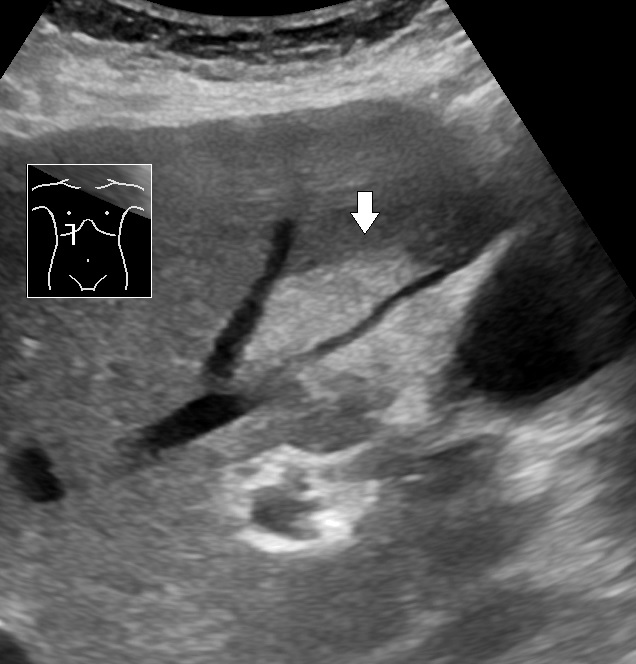
- This focal fatty change seen on abdominal ultrasonography is distinguished from a tumor by not compressing the hepatic vein going through it

Focal fatty liver (FFL) is localised or patchy process of lipid accumulation in the liver. It is likely to have different pathogenesis than non-alcoholic steatohepatitis which is a diffuse process. FFL may result from altered venous flow to liver, tissue hypoxia and malabsorption of lipoproteins. The condition has been increasingly recognised as sensitivity of abdominal imaging studies continues to improve. A fine needle biopsy is often performed to differentiate it from malignancy.
