= Friends for Life =

Friends for Life may refer to:

- Friends for Life (Debby Boone album), 1987
- Friends for Life (Buju Banton album), 2003
- Friends for Life (Montserrat Caballé album), 1997
- Friends for Life, a 2013 album by The High Kings
- "Amigos Para Siempre" or "Amigos Para Siempre (Friends for Life)", a song written by Andrew Lloyd Webber and Don Black, recorded by Sarah Brightman and José Carreras
- Amici per la pelle (English: Friends for Life), a 1955 film directed by Franco Rossi
- "Friends for Life", an episode of Bear in the Big Blue House
- The motto of the 1992 Summer Olympics in Barcelona
