= National Christian Forensics and Communications Association =

U.S. speech and debate league

NCFCA Christian Speech & Debate League
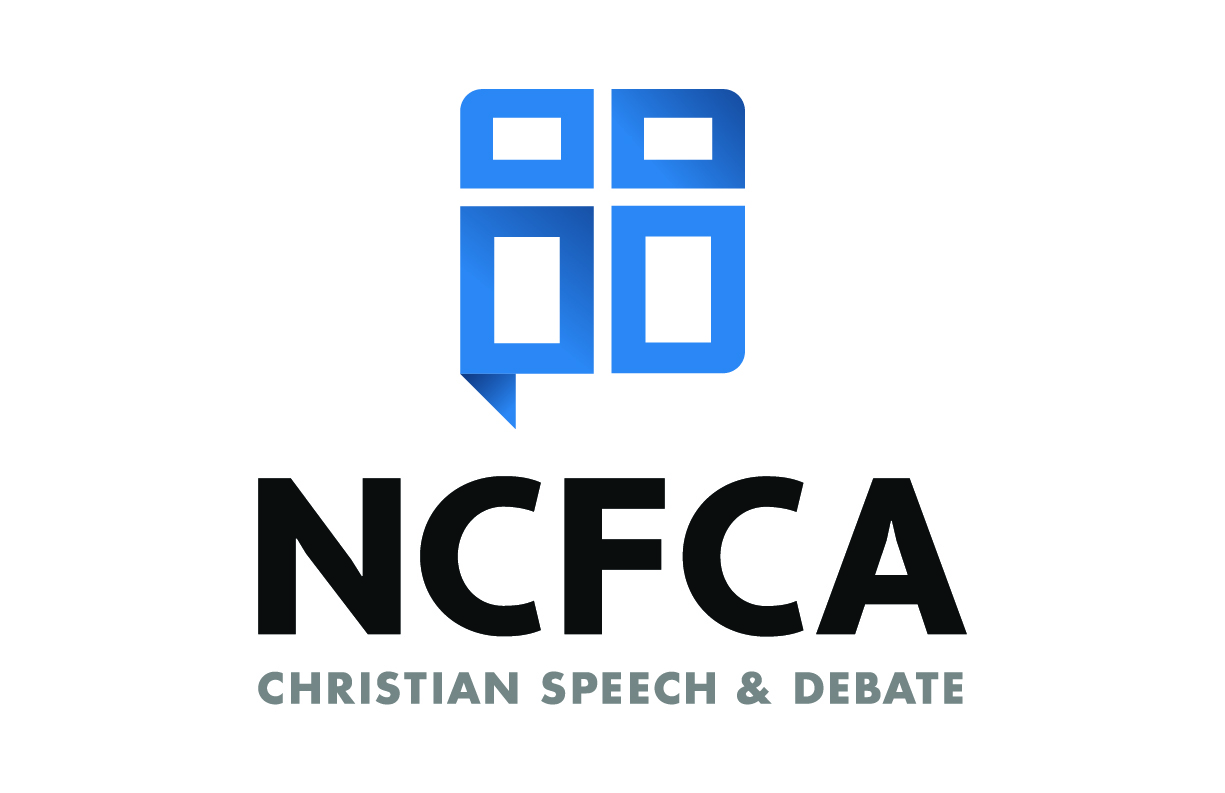
- Logo
- Formation: 1995
- Headquarters: Mountlake Terrace, Washington, United States
- Website: ncfca.org

The Christian Speech & Debate League, also known as the National Christian Forensics and Communications Association, is a speech and debate league for Christian students in the United States. The NCFCA was established in 2001 after outgrowing its parent organization, the Home School Legal Defense Association (HSLDA), which had been running the league since it was originally established in 1995. NCFCA is now organized under its own board of directors with regional and state leadership coordinating various tournaments throughout the season.

== Structure of the organization ==
The NCFCA is a volunteer-run, non-profit organization. Tournaments are run by volunteers, who are usually parents, club directors, and league officials in the area. The judging pool includes parents of competitors, NCFCA alumni, and members of the community. For moot court, the judging pool includes parents of competitors and members of the community with experience in law (e.g. attorneys, judges). Coaches also serve as judges on a volunteer basis. The NCFCA is governed by a board and divided into fourteen regions. Each region has a regional coordinator and each state has a representative.

=== Regional Qualifiers and Regional Championship ===
Each region hosts three "regional qualifiers," open to all competitors competing in Lincoln-Douglas, Team Policy, and speeches, between January and April. Competitors who advance from preliminary rounds to elimination rounds at any regional qualifier earn a slot at the regional championship, usually between April and May. Each region is allocated a certain number of national slots for a debate or speech event, according to the number of competitors nationally and regionally in a given event. As of the 2023 - 2024 season, there were 800 slots given out nationally for speech, and 120 slots for debate.

=== Size ===
During the 2022–2023 season, there were roughly 3,000 students participating, making the NCFCA the third largest national high school speech and debate league after the National Speech and Debate Association and the National Catholic Forensic League.

== Speech ==
The NCFCA offers ten individual events for speech from three categories: Platform (memorized, 10-minute speeches), Interpretation (short interpretations of written works), and Limited Preparation (impromptu or limited preparation speeches). The rules for each of these events are published in the Speech Guide each season. Additionally, every year or every few years NCFCA changes the specific speech categories to be competed in that year. As of the 2025-2026 season the speeches are the following:

Limited Prep: Impromptu, Apologetics, and Extemporaneous

Platform Speeches: Persuasive, Informative, and Digital Presentation

Interpretation: Open Interpretation, Duo Interpretation, Oratorical Thematic, and Biblical Presentation

== Debate and Moot Court ==
The NCFCA offers two types of debate: Team Policy Debate, Lincoln-Douglas Value Debate, as well as Moot Court. The NCFCA discourages the use of overly complicated theory and extremely fast talking (also known as "spreading"), instead encouraging effective communication of complex topics to lay judges.

At tournaments, competitors speak in six rounds and are judged by one judge in preliminary rounds. In elimination rounds, competitors are judged by three judges and are judged by five judges in the qualifier tournament final.

- Team Policy (TP): A policy-centered debate, with rounds typically lasting 90 minutes. Two teams of two competitors form the 'Affirmative' and 'Negative' sides to the debate, with the Affirmative arguing for a reform to the system and the Negative arguing against it. The debate is set by a resolution that is published before a season starts. The resolution for the 2025–26 season is "The United States Federal Government should significantly reform Congress." The resolution includes input from competitors and typically alternates between domestic and international policy.
- Lincoln-Douglas (LD): A value-centered debate, with rounds lasting around 45 minutes. Two competitors form the 'Affirmative' and 'Negative' sides to the debate, with the Affirmative affirming the validity of the resolution and the Negative negating it. As in Team Policy, the debate is governed by a resolution affirming one value above another. The resolution for the 2024 - 2025 is "in combat, the use of automation ought to be valued above the use of military personnel." The resolution for the 2025-26 season is, "in the exploration and utilization of outer space, international cooperation should be prioritized."

== See also ==
- Competitive debate in the United States
- National Forensic League
- National Catholic Forensic League
- Stoa USA
