= Dramatic Interpretation =

American student debating society event

Dramatic Interpretation (often shortened to "Dramatic Interp," "Drama" or just "DI") is an event in National Speech and Debate Association (and NSDA-related) high school forensics competitions. In the National Christian Forensics and Communications Association and the National Catholic Forensic League, the event is combined with Humorous Interpretation to create the Dramatic Performance event. It consists of a piece from any published work, edited to fit within a 10-minute span with a 30-second grace period (it does not have a minimum and cannot be above 10:30).

In a typical round of DI, five to seven performers will each perform a "cutting" (excerpt) from a readily available, published (copyrighted or non-copyrighted) play, novel, or short story. As the name suggests, the cuttings are invariably from non-comedic (e.g., dramatic) works. Some performers select monologues, others may adopt the roles of many different characters, changing their tone, manner, and the position of their body to indicate a change in character.

After all of the competitors have performed, the judge (or judges) in the round will rank them from best to worst, and assign each of them a score. Contestants who score well will "break" out of preliminary rounds and continue to advance through octo/quarter/semi/final rounds if they continue to score well.

== NSDA Nationals ==
National Speech and Debate Association Nationals was hosted in Salt Lake City, Utah in 2016. National Champions are awarded a scholarship of US$1,000. To receive the title a competitor must have the lowest cumulative score throughout the duration of the tournament. The Dramatic Interpretation competitor to receive the lowest cumulative score in the final round is awarded the BAMA Bowl and a US$500 scholarship. The National Speech and Debate Association (NSDA) National Tournament is the largest academic competition in the world.

=== Past NSDA Champions ===
Year	Competitor	Academic Institution
1931	Kathryn Harney	Peoria-Manual, Illinois
1932	Pauline Crockett	California, Pennsylvania
1933	Denton Snyder	Humboldt, Iowa
1934	Donald Swanson	Webster City, Iowa
1935	Mary Ann Porterfield	Topeka, Kansas
1936	Caleb Peterson	Peekskill, New York
1937	Virginia Kraft	Mediapolis, Iowa
1938	Jack Edwards	Hollywood, California
1939	Ben Morris	Oklahoma City-Classen, Oklahoma
1940	James Lee	Santa Rosa, California
1941	Jean Swidensky	Oklahoma City-Central, Oklahoma
1946	Rae June Decker	DuQuoin, Illinois
1947	Beulah Meacham	Canton-McKinley, Ohio
1948	Ralph Jensen	Kenosha, Wisconsin
1949	Carolyn Parks	Santa Rosa, California
1950	Carolyn Parks	Santa Rosa, California
1951	Sue Routsong	Dayton-Oakwood, Ohio
1955	Shirley Shubin	Los Angeles HS, California
1956	Dan McCall	Modesto, California
1957	April Shawhan	Dayton-Fairmont, Ohio
1958	Karen McPeek	Euclid, Ohio
1959	Alan Haufrect	Houston-Bellaire, Texas
1960	Albertha Hillmon	Stockton Edison, California
1961	Paul Bernath	Houston-Jesse Jones, Texas
1962	Joe Rowlette	West Plains, Missouri
1963	Andy Fichter	Delaware-Hayes, Ohio
1964	Camille Waters	Houston-Bellaire, Texas
1965	Suzanne Abernathy	Paris-Grove, Tennessee
1966	Joan Rue	Lexington-Clay, Kentucky
1967	Brent Mintz	Houston-Bellaire, Texas
1968	Ruben Delgado	Stockton Edison, California
1969	Darren Kelley	Anaheim-Loara, California
1970	John Wall	Campbellsville, Kentucky
1971	John Leamer	Fairmont East HS, Kettering, Ohio
1972	Annalee Jefferies	Houston-Bellaire HS, Texas
1973	Mark Ferguson	Perry HS, Ohio
1974	Robert Rosenberg	Toledo-DeVilbiss HS, Ohio
1975	Darryl Bowdre	McAlester HS, Oklahoma
1976	Lynne Joyner	Bellevue Newport HS, Washington
1977	Michael Mandell	Logansport HS, Indiana
1978	Andrew Sattee	Pine Crest Prep. HS, Florida
1979	Steven Young	New Richmond HS, Wisconsin
1980	Solveig Olsen	Sioux Falls-Lincoln, South Dakota
1981	Darrell Johnson	Okmulgee, Oklahoma
1982	Greg Dolph	Chesterton HS, Indiana
1983	Robert Strain	San Antonio-Roosevelt, Texas
1984	Geoff Abbott	Sioux Falls-O’Gorman HS, South Dakota
1985	Andy Thornton	San Antonio-Churchill HS, Texas
1986	David Getzendaner	Kansas City-Park Hill, Missouri
1987	Lance Harshbarger	Shawnee Mission-South HS, Kansas
1988	Brenda McElroy	Milton Academy, Massachusetts
1989	Greg Wilson	Hanks HS, Texas
1990	Dan Sklar	Glenbrook North HS, Illinois
1991	Demond Wilson	Vines HS, Texas
1992	Colin Stokes	San Antonio-Churchill, Texas
1993	Chris Conner	Kinkaid School, Texas
1994	Danny Beaty	Miami Valley School, Ohio
1995	Susan Bohannon	Albuquerque Academy, New Mexico
1996	Jelena Moore	James Logan HS, California
1997	Michael Washington	Plano Sr. HS, Texas
1998	Michael Urie	Plano Sr. HS, Texas
1999	John Egan	Eagan HS, Minnesota
2000	Esther Etuk	Newman Smith HS, Texas
2001	Aimee DeShayes	Syosset HS, New York
2002	Krystyn Spratt	Apple Valley HS, Minnesota
2003	Pierre Clark	James Logan HS, California
2004	D’Angelo Lacy	Creekview HS, Texas
2005	Cory D. Stewart	Eastview HS, Minnesota
2006	Blake Williams	The Montgomery Academy, Alabama
2007	Nana Amoah, Jr.	Edison HS, Virginia
2008	Stephen Elrod	Bellarmine College Prep, California
2009	Jane Bruce	Ogden HS, Utah
2010	Michael Carone	Monsignor Farrell HS, New York
2011	Jamaque Newberry	Nova HS, Florida
2012	Deshawn Weston	Grand Prairie HS, Texas
2013	Anthony Nadeau	Royal Palm Beach HS, Florida
2014	Abigail Onwunali	Hastings HS, Texas
2015	Daniel Williams	Holy Cross School, Louisiana
2016	Izabella Czejdo	McDowell HS, Pennsylvania
2017	Chase Garrett	Southside HS, South Carolina
2018	Kimberly Lee	Summit HS, New Jersey
2019	Jacob Foster	Comeaux HS, Louisiana
2020	Semaj Lee	Apple Valley HS, Minnesota
2021	Giana Martinez	L. C. Anderson HS, Texas
2022	Logan Green	Hattiesburg HS, Mississippi
2023	Kylan Williams	Comeaux HS, Louisiana
2024	Karla Rivera	Harlingen HS South, Texas

== Rules ==
Dramatic Interpretation falls under the jurisdiction of events under the category defined as “Interpretation” by the National Speech and Debate Association (NSDA). These events are Humorous Interpretation, Duo Interpretation, and Program Oral Interpretation. Events that do not fall under the jurisdiction of the following rules include, but are not limited to Poetry, Prose, and Storytelling. The National Speech and Debate Associations rules are organized into categories of length, material, material availability, performance, re-use, and website approval submission process.

=== Length ===
The set time limit is ten minutes with a thirty-second period in which a student may go overtime with no penalty, colloquially referred to as a 'grace period.'According to National Speech and Debate Association rules, a student who exceeds the ten minute and thirty-second time limit cannot be awarded the rank of 1st in the round. There is no minimum time limit.

=== Material and material availability ===
A student may choose from a single work of literature to perform. Acceptable forms of literature include:

- Novels
- Plays
- Anthologies where only one piece of literature is performed
- Poetry
- Song lyrics

=== Performance ===
In Dramatic Interpretation, Duo Interpretation, and Humorous Interpretation performers are not permitted to use any type of "physical objects or costuming." In addition, students may not:

- Adapt material for purposes other than transitional. Controversially, sub-point 5. An under Interpretations on the National Speech and Debate Association Manual has been used to disqualify national finalist and national champions during and after the final round at National Speech and Debate Association Nationals. (See Humorous Interpretation (Contestant H208))
- Rely on the use of scripts.

=== Re-use ===
Students may not perform the same work of literature at any National Speech and Debate Association tournament if they have already done so in a separate contestant year.

=== Website approval submission process ===
All piece selection is subject to online year-round review.

== Collegiate Dramatic Interpretation ==
In intercollegiate forensics, a competitor may use one or more theatrical scripts to craft a dramatic narrative involving one or multiple characters. The dramatic material can originate from a variety of sources, ranging from stage, screen, to radio. Unlike dramatic interpretation performances at the high school level, collegiate competitors are required to use a manuscript throughout their performance.

=== Past AFA Champions ===
Year	Competitor	Academic Institution
1978	Scott Schaeffer	DePaul University
1979	Terry Kiel	Minnesota State University, Mankato
1980	Steve Geck	St. Cloud State University
1981	Mark Fredo	PennWest Clarion
1982	Michael Eckert	George Mason University
1983	Philip Shelburne	Southern Utah University
1984	Greg Dolph	Bradley University
1985	Greg Dolph	Bradley University
1986	Greg Dolph	Bradley University
1987	Vincent Bly	Kansas State University
1988	Florence Woodard	Howard University
1989	Sarah Braun	Bradley University
1990	Paige Petrucka	Southern Utah University
1991	Zoe Brown	University of Alabama
1992	Jason Davidson	Bradley University
1993	August Benassi	Bradley University
1994	Dustin Abraham	Arizona State University
1995	Andrew Greene	California State University, Los Angeles
1996	Esther Austin	California State University, Chico
1997	Eduardo Maytorena	California State University, Los Angeles
1998	Sara Mayer	University of Texas at Austin
1999	Jill Valentine	Bradley University
2000	Paige White	University of Alabama
2001	Ryan Knowles	University of La Verne
2002	Javon Johnson	California State University, Los Angeles
2003	Scott Boras	University of Wisconsin-Eau Claire
2004	Tatiana Simonian	California State University, Los Angeles
2005	Robert Hawkins	San Francisco State University
2006	Ashley Brasfield	Western Kentucky University
2007	Sonequa Martin	University of Alabama
2008	Julia Kolsrud	Arizona State University
2009	Nick Bateman	George Mason University
2010	Amanda Voirol	Bradley University
2011	Kane Kennedy	James Madison University
2012	Kaybee Brown	Lone Star College-North Harris
2013	Kaybee Brown	Bradley University
2014	Robi Mahan	Illinois State University
2015	Karlee Currin	University of Nebraska Omaha
2016	Abigail Onwunali	University of Texas at Austin
2017	Caleb Merritt	Hastings College
2018	Marianna Garcia	University of Texas at Austin
2019	Sarah Courville	University of Texas at Austin
2021	Paige Allbright	Western Kentucky University
2022	Emily Feazel	Seton Hall University
2023	Kaylee Frazier	University of Texas at Austin
2024	David Jacobson	University of Minnesota Twin Cities
2025	Aaron Anderson	Tennessee State University

Due to COVID-19, the 2020 tournament was canceled, resulting in no champion.

=== Past NFA Champions ===
Year	Competitor	Academic Institution
2008	Emambu Atabong	Bradley University
2009	Vanessa Carranza	Bradley University
2010	Jerome Davis	Western Kentucky University
2011	Elle Pratt	Bradley University
2012	Jasmine McLeod	California State University, Long Beach
2013	Ben Davis	North Central College
2014	Austin Groves	Western Kentucky University
2015	Huy Pham	Ball State University
2016	Abigail Onwunali	University of Texas at Austin
2017	Abigail Onwunali	University of Texas at Austin
2018	Marianna Garcia	University of Texas at Austin
2019	Sarah Courville	University of Texas at Austin
2021	Cheriaca Huntley	George Mason University
2022	Paige Allbright	Western Kentucky University
2023	Gavin Millard	Eastern Michigan University
2024	Cecilia Alali	Western Kentucky University

Due to the COVID-19 pandemic, the 2020 tournament was canceled. However, the NFA permitted competitors in their senior year to submit recordings of their speeches for an asynchronous competition. The top performing student in each category was ranked as the Performance of Highest Distinction. The Performance of Highest Distinction in Dramatic Interpretation was awarded to Trijae from Bradley University.

== See also ==
- Duo Interpretation
- Humorous Interpretation
- National Christian Forensics and Communications Association
- National Forensic League
- National Speech and Debate Association
