= Congressional Debate =

American high school debate event

Congressional Debate (also known as Student Congress, Legislative Debate) is a competitive interscholastic high school debate event in the United States. The National Speech & Debate Association (NSDA), National Catholic Forensic League (NCFL) and many state associations and national invitational tournaments offer Congressional Debate as an event. Each organization and tournament offers its own rules, although the NSDA has championed standardization since 2007, when it began to ask its districts to use one of a number of procedures for qualification to its National Tournament.

In Congressional Debate, high school students emulate members of the United States Congress by debating pieces of legislation, including bills and resolutions. Before the event, each school submits mock legislation to each tournament. After the legislation has been compiled, it is distributed to each participating team. Each team attempts to research as many topics as possible, with each participant choosing to stand in affirmation or negation of the legislation being debated.

== Legislation ==
Unlike other debate events, students drive the topics for discussion by drafting their own legislation for submission to tournaments. The bills and resolutions must be national in scope, and must either fall within jurisdiction for lawmaking by the United States Congress as a bill, or express a specific position and/or recommendation for further action outside of Congress' jurisdiction as a resolution. There are three main legislative types: bills, resolutions, and constitutional amendments.

Tournaments may review legislation submitted before sharing the overall docket with all participating schools. Contestants from each school research and prepare arguments both in favor and against each legislation in the docket before arriving at the tournament. It is important that this happens.

== Chambers and sessions ==
Students attending each tournament are divided up into sections of 10-30 (usually 15–20, the NSDA recommendation is 18). These individual rooms are called chambers, and sometimes labeled as a "House", or "Senate," depending on the region and the tournament.

During each phase of a tournament (preliminary and elimination), there is at least one round, often referred to as a "session." The National Speech & Debate Association defines a session as having:

- Ten minutes of time allocated for each student (average is three hours for 18-20 contestants)
- Election of a presiding officer
- New seating chart (necessary accommodations for students with special needs may be made)
- Resetting of precedence/recency
- New legislation that has not been debated in a previous session at that tournament
- The same contestants stay in one chamber, until the tournament advances to the next level of elimination.

While larger tournaments may have preliminary rounds that precede elimination rounds (semifinals, finals, etc.), smaller tournaments may not have elimination rounds and may recognize and award students in individual chambers.

=== Setting the agenda ===
Rounds usually begin with a method for determining which bills will be debated and in which order, referred to as the docket. This most commonly happens with a nominated docket at the tournament, although some areas have a system of informal caucusing or highly organized committees, which convene to review legislation that has been subdivided by the tournament to address a specific topic area, such as is done in the National Catholic Forensic League. A common committee structure includes: "Public Welfare," "Economics," and "Foreign Affairs."

=== Speeches ===
Congressional Debate speeches last up to three minutes and 10 seconds. From 3:00 - 3:10, the Presiding Officer will gavel the speaker down, getting louder before cutting the speaker off at 3 minutes and 10 seconds. The first speech on each legislation, known as the "authorship", goes to the person who wrote the legislation, or from the same school of the author. (However, many tournaments use legislation from the NSDA, in which case anyone can give the authorship.) If nobody from the author's school is present, another debater gives a sponsorship speech (sometimes called the first affirmative), which is functionally identical to an authorship. This first speech is followed by a two-minute questioning period. One three-minute speech in opposition (negation) follows it, with another mandatory two minutes of questioning. After these initial speeches, debate alternates in favor and opposition to the legislation with three-minute speeches and one minute of questioning. Within each speech, contestants develop two or three organized, logical arguments supported by credible evidence for why the chamber should vote for or against the given legislation. The general format of a speech is as follows:

1. Introduction: Usually, speeches begin with some sort of attention-getting device, such as a quotation (which could be humorous, shocking, or sad) or statistic. The introduction is tied to the central thesis of the speech, as the speaker urges the chamber to vote in support or opposition. Sometimes, the two or three main lines of argument are previewed to give the audience an idea of where the speech is leading; however, some criticize this practice as a waste of limited time.
2. Contentions: Two or three arguments for or against the legislation. Each contention is explained in the speaker's own words and supported by evidence from reputable and relevant sources.
3. Conclusion: The speaker often restates their 2 or 3 contentions and returns to the attention-getting device from the introduction to give the speech thematic unity. Alternatively, conclusions can consist of merely 1 or 2 sentences, such as "For these reasons you must pass/defeat this bill/resolution/legislation."

=== Questioning ===
Questioning, traditionally, has been the standard set by the debate rules. After a speaker has given a speech, they are subjected to a minute of questioning (typically two, thirty second blocks, or during the first aff/neg speech, two minutes with four blocks), where the speaker and a questioner engage in back and forth dialogue with minimal moderation from the chair. This is used to sometimes build arguments that the questioner uses in a later speech, similar to cross-examination in other competitive debate events. At tournaments where this is practiced, the presiding officer is either required or strongly advised to keep a separate questioning priority, to ensure equal opportunity for questioners. Several tournaments have piloted this method since the National Speech & Debate Association suggested this as a result of discussions with its Congressional Debate Rules and Recommendations Committee in 2009.

Rules typically do not allow for "prefacing," where students formulate a statement or argument as part of their question; rather, they must simply ask a question, and only a question. However this rule may not be present at some tournaments, or there may be some exceptions allowed.

Some leagues and tournaments still use a protocol where the balanced of unused speaking time is reserved for questioning, rather than having a specific period.

While some student questioners feel the need to ask if the speaker yields, this is unnecessary under procedure, because the standing rules of the organizations and tournaments provide specific parameters for questioning periods that already establish when questioning begins.

== Procedure and presiding officers ==
While all Congressional Debate competition rely upon parliamentary procedure as practiced in Congress (i.e. the Standing Rules of the United States Senate or the Procedures of the United States House of Representatives) as the underpinning for how sessions are conducted, there may be slight variations in how the competition itself is run. Each chamber has a presiding officer (PO) or chair. At the beginning of each session, contestants in the chamber nominate candidates. Usually, each nominee gives a brief candidacy speech introducing themselves and stating their qualifications. Contestants then elect a presiding officer by majority via individual, secret balloting.

The presiding officer's job is to facilitate fair, balanced, and efficient debate during the session in which they have been elected through recognition of speakers, questioners, and motions. At the end of many tournaments students in the chamber vote on which presiding officer was the best, and some tournaments have a separate means for judge recognition of presiding officers.

=== Speaker recognition ===
The presiding officer always calls for an author or sponsor for the first legislation in order, and the author always gets first right of refusal. When a session starts, there usually are not predetermined methods for selecting contestants for their first speech. Once speakers have been recognized, the universal rule in all leagues and tournaments is to first recognize those who have not spoken, or those who have spoken least (referred to as "precedence"). Beyond that, the National Speech & Debate Association and common practice have dictated that students also consider who spoke earlier (referred to as "recency"). Before precedence and recency are established, the presiding officer must recognize speakers fairly and equitably. The National Speech & Debate Tournament and many tournaments have (as of 2012) ruled the use of methods that tie the number of questions asked or motions made to speaker recognition, as well as how many times a student has stood, out of order, because they result in competitors simply "playing the game".

Often, coaches will instruct students who preside to call on contestants for early speeches that they do not know, and/or who are less experienced. Additionally, since debate becomes more complex after more arguments have been introduced, later speakers bear a higher burden for clash and refutation.

=== Motions ===
The National Speech & Debate Association's Table of Parliamentary Motions is in use by almost every organization that conducts Congressional Debate competition, including the National Catholic Forensic League. The motions are similar, if not usually identical to those used in Congress with a few exceptions, including the one-thirds second required to amend a motion or legislation, to prevent abuse of that protocol.

The presiding officer never should call for motions; rather, contestants should rise and say "motion," and then that they move a specific motion.

==== Frequently used motions ====
The following motions are used at almost all Congressional Debate tournaments:

Motion	Notes	Second Required	Fraction of Chamber Required
To open the floor for debate*	Also called the "main motion"	Yes	Majority
To take a bill from the table	Re-opens debate on tabled legislation, which may or may not have already been debated	Yes	Majority
To lay a bill on the table	Pauses debate on a bill. Some states typically return to vote on all tabled items before the conclusion of a tournament, but there is no rule requiring this.	Yes	Majority
To call the previous question	To call the "previous question" ends debate on a bill and states the main motion to vote on it	Yes	2/3
To recess	The time of the recess (e.g. "for ten minutes" or "until 11:30") must be specified	Yes	Majority
To rise to a point of personal privilege	To make a personal request	No	Decision of chair
To rise to a point of order/parliamentary procedure	To correct a parliamentary error, ask a question, or clarify a procedure	No	Decision of chair
To amend	Modifies a pending motion or the pending bill/resolution; filled-out slip must be passed to P.O. in advance	1/3 second triggers debate on the amendment	2/3 majority to call the previous question to end debate, then majority to pass.
To adjourn	Made at the end of a tournament	Yes	Majority

* Widely recognized to be an unnecessary motion. The rule in Congress states that the floor is opened by the presiding officer, not by a motion coming from the chamber.

These motions are allowed at some Congressional Debate tournaments, depending on the region and the style of debate:

Motion	Notes	Second Required	Fraction of Chamber Required
To demand a roll call vote	Used to verify a voice vote or vote by show-of-hands.	Yes	1/5
To call for division of the house	Used to verify a voice vote	No	No (demand by a single member requires a re-count)
To modify or withdraw a motion	To change or take back a motion that has not yet passed	Yes, only if chair has already stated the motion	Majority (after motion is stated by chair), no vote required if motion has not been stated.
To suspend the rules	To take an action against rules (such as adding another minute of questioning)	Yes	2/3
To appeal a decision of the chair	Allows chamber to overrule the PO's ruling on a prior point of order	Yes	Majority
To extend questioning time (by a stated time)*	To continue asking questions of the speaker	Yes	2/3

This requires a suspension of the rules.*

==== Main motion ====
The term "main motion" refers to the primary question before the assembly; in Congressional Debate, this is the legislation as presented on the agenda, so it is never necessary for a contestant to specifically move the main motion. Main motions can be changed or affected by a variety of subsidiary motions.

The following motions end debate on the pending main motion:

- Previous question (ends debate and moves to voting on the legislation).
- Lay on the Table (pauses debate until a motion to take from the table passes).
- Recess (pauses debate for the specified duration of the recess, debate resumes automatically on return)
- Adjourn (ends debate on the pending item and any items left on the table; any item not passed automatically fails without a vote)

Only one main motion is in order at any given time. If the chamber wishes to change to another legislation while another is still being considered, the chamber must end debate (which could include pausing debate by laying on the table) before changing to the desired item. Some tournaments establish a minimum time before the previous question can be moved; others limit how long each legislation may be debated. When debate gets one-sided, or "stale," often a contestant will rise and move the previous question, which requires two-thirds of the chamber concurring. If this motion fails, the presiding officer would rule any immediate subsequent motion to "lay on the table" (requiring a simple majority vote) out of order, since that is an abusive way to circumvent the spirit of the rules to allow the minority a voice before majority rules.

==== Voting ====
After the previous question has been moved, the presiding officer calls for a vote on the legislation, and after counting votes, announces whether the ayes or noes have it, and the motion carries or is defeated. Note that "yay" and "nay" are archaic modes of voting expression that are no longer used in parliamentary parlance.

It is commonplace for students to move a recess following voting.

==== Amendments ====
Amendments are an important tool that can add nuance and perspective to debate on a particular issue, even though they are not practiced as often as they once were. To amend, a student will submit the amendment in writing to the head table (often rising to a point of personal privilege and seeking permission to approach the rostrum). The presiding officer (often in consultation with the parliamentarian) will first determine if the amendment is germane; or if it changes the original intent of the legislation, it is ruled dilatory. The author of the amendment then moves to amend, and if the presiding officer rules it germane, they read it aloud to the chamber and calls for a one-thirds second (usually by voice vote). If one-third of the chamber concurs to consider the amendment, the presiding officer then calls for a speech in support of the amendment. At most tournaments, the speech introducing or sponsoring the amendment is not guaranteed to its author, and in fact, it is common practice in some areas for a contestant to immediately move the previous question on the amendment. If that happens, it is not debated before the chamber passes or defeats the amendment. If the amendment passes, subsequent debate on the legislation must consider the legislation as amended.

== Judging ==
Judges either serve as a scorers or parliamentarians. Scorers judge individual sessions.

1. Evaluate individual speeches, awarding speaker points (usually on a 1-6 scale)
2. Evaluate the presiding officer, awarding speaker points (usually on a 1-6 scale)
3. Holistically rank the judge's eight most preferred contestants, considering the presiding officer for inclusion or exclusion among those eight.

=== Evaluating speeches ===
While judging a speech is subjective, there are certain key standards that distinguish effectiveness:

- Content: organization, evidence and language: logical arrangement of ideas; depth of thought; support from a variety of credible quantitative (statistical) and qualitative (expert testimony) evidence analyzed to draw conclusions; compelling language; memorable introduction and conclusion; and cohesive transitions to establish speaker’s purpose and frame perspective of the issue’s significance.
- Argument & Refutation: arguments have clear claims, are substantiated with sound, analysis and evidence, and explain the impact on those affected; these ideas are either new/fresh, or clear extensions rather than mere repetition of what has already been said; refutation of opposing arguments actually disproves them, rather than simply listing and saying they’re wrong; answers to questions are given in similar structure.
- Delivery: vocal control and physical poise are deliberate, crisp and confident. Delivery should be extemporaneous and engaging others in the room, with few errors in pronunciation. Eye contact is effective and consistent.
- Response to Questioning: when the speaker is answering a question, they can adequately defend their speeches under scrutiny from other speakers. This can include directly answering a question, clarifying something within their speech, or reflecting a question back onto the questioner.

=== Evaluating presiding officers ===
The presiding officer always is taken into consideration for recognition in the chamber by judges (usually through ranking at the end of the session), and some tournaments have both the scorers and parliamentarian evaluate the presiding officer, while others just have one or the other do so. The following key standards distinguish effectiveness:

- Speaker Recognition: Methods are clearly explained at the beginning of the session and executed consistently. The PO is consistent in recognition (very few errors) and rulings, distributing speeches throughout the room, equally between schools of the same size, and among individuals.
- Parliamentary Procedure: Command of parliamentary procedure (motions) to transparently run a fair and efficient session, seldom consulting written rules and ruling immediately on whether motions pass or fail, but consulting the parliamentarian when necessary to ensure accuracy.
- Delivery/Presence: Dynamically fosters order and trust, and relates to peers well through vocal and physical presence. Word choice is economical and eloquent. The PO does not hesitate to rule abusive or inappropriate motions out of order. They foster trust by peers.

=== Parliamentarian ===
In addition to judges who score speeches, most tournaments have a parliamentarian in each chamber. Unlike scorers who generally rotate each session, the parliamentarian remains in one chamber for all sessions (preliminary, semifinal or final). The parliamentarian's role is a fairly passive one; their main purpose is to serve as a reference on parliamentary procedure in case there is confusion or a dispute the presiding officer cannot resolve. Unless either the presiding officer makes (or fails to correct) a major error in procedure or else the debate gets bogged down the parliamentarian will generally not intervene in the proceedings unless asked by someone in the chamber.

== History ==
The first high school national Congress was held in 1938 by the National Forensic League, now known as the National Speech & Debate Association. Like other forms of debate, it emphasizes clash of ideas, and consideration of questions of policy (bills) and value (resolutions). It operates like a forensic speech event with sectioning of multiple entries per section and comparative ranking and rating by points (as opposed to pairing just two entries and wins/losses). Since 2000, the event has been growing nationwide, added by several states as State Tournament event, and added to numerous large invitational tournaments.

=== National trends ===
In the past decade, Congressional Debate has spread widely across the debate community. The first major tournament outside of NSDA and NCFL nationals to hold Congressional Debate was the Harvard University Tournament traditionally held near President's Day weekend in February. Other major tournaments which host congress competitions include The Barkley Forum for High Schools at Emory University, The University of Florida Blue Key, Yale, Princeton, the Villiger tournament in Philadelphia, the Glenbrooks tournament in Chicago, the Crestiann Classic in Florida, Pennsbury, Princeton, George Mason, the Minneapple Debate Tournament in Minnesota, Stanford, the California Invitational at UC Berkeley, the Sunvitational in Florida, and Nova Titan Invitational in Florida. In addition, Congress is now one of the official events at the debate Tournament of Champions, hosted by the University of Kentucky. Students who achieve a high level of competitive success at other national tournaments qualify to compete at the TOC, which brings together some of the best congresspersons from across the nation. The nomenclature of "congressional debate" is also the result of a shift in recent times toward a more debate-oriented category. In the past, the category focused more on simulating the Congress through oratory skills, hence the name "student congress." The trend is to strike a balance between eloquent speech and reasoned debate.

== See also ==
- Competitive debate in the United States
- Model Congress
