= Oral interpretation =

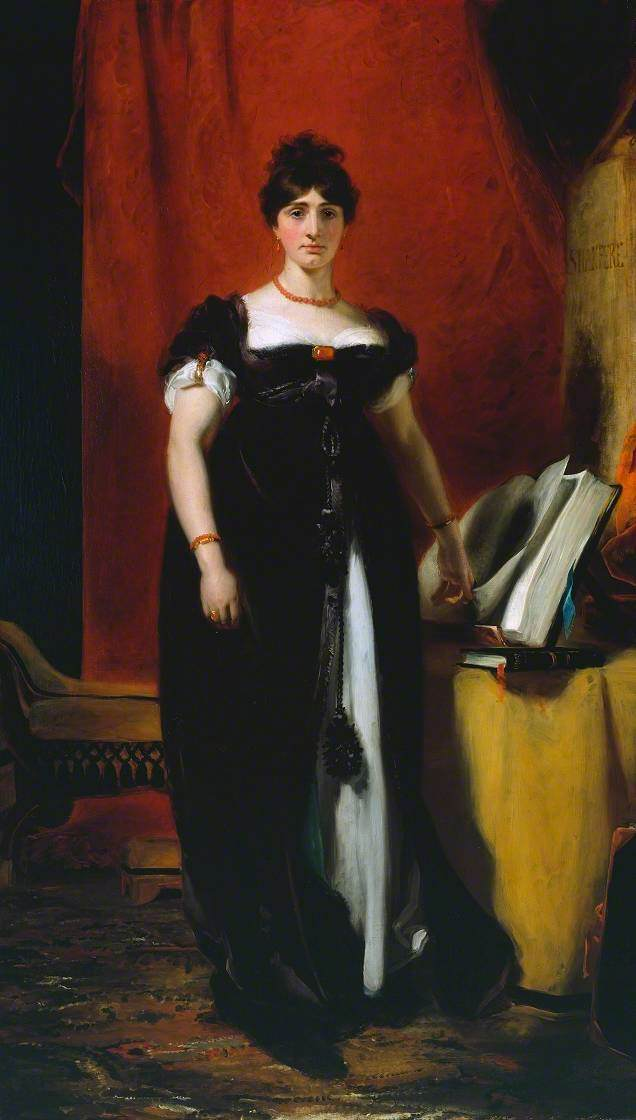
Portrait of Sarah Siddons by Thomas Lawrence, 1804. Siddons, the leading tragedienne of her era, is shown during a dramatic reading

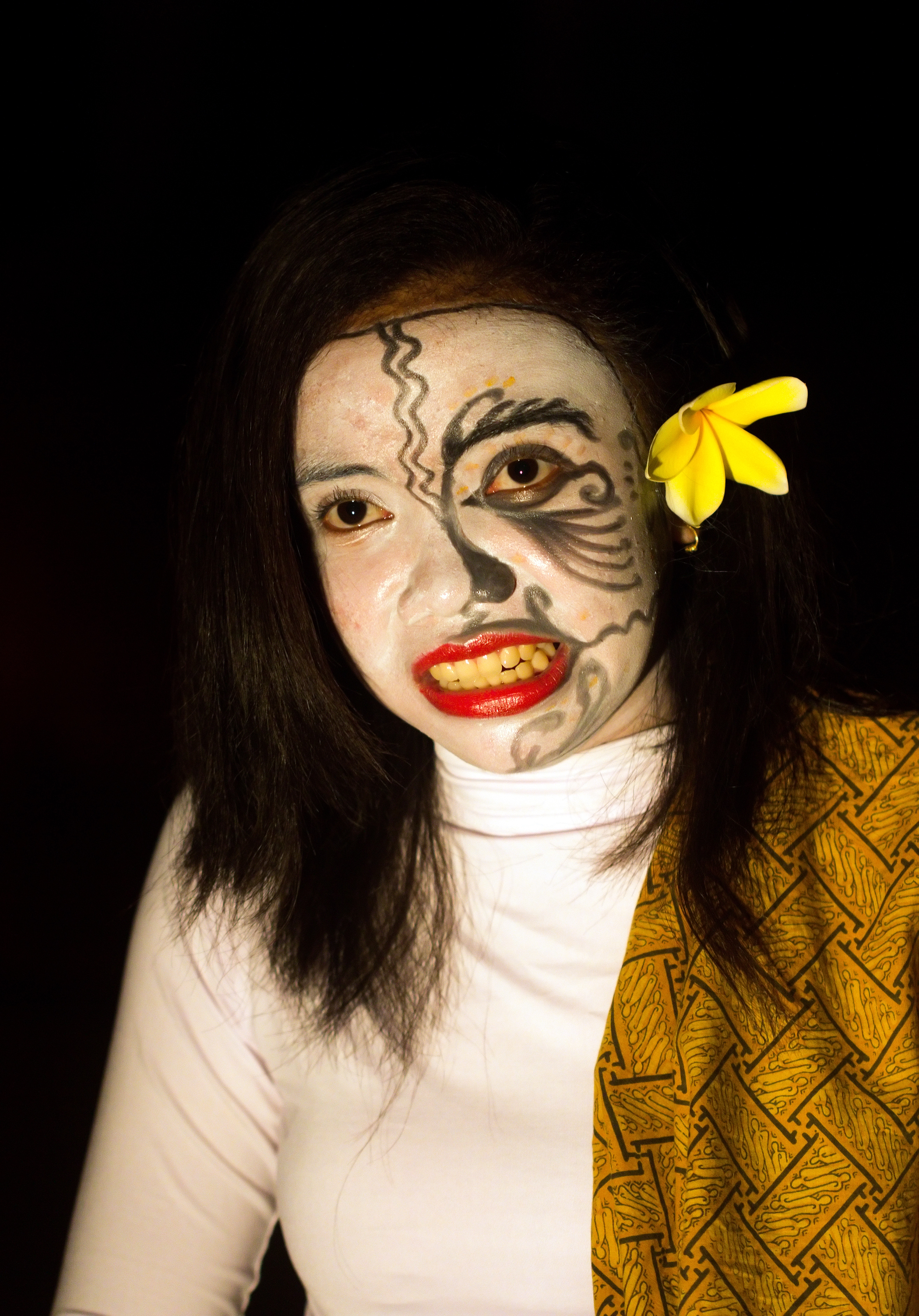
A student of Yogyakarta State University performing a dramatic reading of a short story

Oral interpretation is a dramatic art, also commonly called "interpretive reading" and "dramatic reading", though these terms are more conservative and restrictive. In certain applications, oral interpretation is also a theater art – as in reader's theater, in which a work of literature is performed with manuscripts in hand or, more traditionally, using stools and music stands; and especially chamber theater, which dispenses with manuscripts and uses what may be described as essentialist costuming and stage lighting, and suggestive scenery.

The term is defined by Paul Campbell (The Speaking and Speakers of Literature; Dickinson, 1967) as the "oralization of literature", and by Charlotte Lee and Timothy Gura (Oral Interpretation; Houghton-Mifflin, 1997) as "the art of communicating to an audience a work of literary art in its intellectual, emotional, and esthetic entirety". Historically essential to Charlotte Lee's definition of oral interpretation is the fact that the performer is "reading from a manuscript". This perspective, once the majority view, has long since become the minority opinion.

Voice and movement technique is opsis ("spectacle") while oral interpretation is, conceptually, melopoiia ("music technique").

Because oral interpretation is an essential dramatic element in all performance art, all actors, singers, storytellers, etc., are interpreters – but not all interpreters are necessarily actors, or singers, or storytellers, and so on. When, for example, the writer David Sedaris reads one of his stories on stage, or when Leonard Cohen performs one of his lyric poems, they are both engaged in the art of oral interpretation.
