= Humorous Interpretation =

Event in high school forensics competitions

Humorous Interpretation (often shortened to "HI", or "Humor") is an event in competitive middle and high school forensics leagues such as the National Christian Forensics and Communications Association and the National Speech and Debate Association. It consists of a piece from any published work, edited to fit within a 10-minute span with a 30-second grace period (it does not have a minimum and cannot be above 10:30). It is judged based upon how the person portrays his or her characters and whether the piece is humorous. Ideally proper portrayal of characters should achieve a comedic effect to the judge. Humorous Interpretation and Dramatic Interpretation pieces are often used for the National Catholic Forensic League category of Dramatic Performance, which has similar rules but allows for a wider variety of pieces.

== Rules ==
While rules vary by state, a piece must be published, cannot exceed ten minutes, and must be of a humorous nature. Performance must include an introduction that states the title of the selection and the author. The introduction is an original work that should remain very brief. A teaser may precede the introduction. However, there may not be any more than 100 added words throughout the piece, including the introduction.

In addition to the introduction being original, competitors may also incorporate verbal transitions, so long as they do not exceed 100 words or change the intent of the author. Other than for transitional and introductory purposes, though, no original words may be added to the piece. Gratuitous vulgarity refers to any unnecessary vulgar actions. Gratuitous vulgarity is not permitted and may result in being marked down. Singing and dancing is allowed in Humorous Interpretation, but it must be motivated by the text and easily justifiable.

Props and costumes are not permitted. Humorous Interpretation must also remain a solo performance. No partners are permitted. Finally, the speech that a competitor is using for Humorous Interpretation, he or she may not use in any other event he or she is entered in.

2016 NSDA National Finalists* - Salt Lake City, UT	Performed By:
1) Defending Your Life ~ Albert Brooks	Jacob Wallack, University School - FL
2) Snap ~ Daryl Watson	Evan Clear, Bishop McGuiness High School -OK
3) Leaving Iowa ~ Tim Clue and Spike Manton	Micah Spieldenner, Chanhassen High School - MN
4) The World's Best Teacher ~ Clint Snyder	Luke Wodrich, Grapevine High School -TX
5) What in God's Name ~ Simon Rich	Mark Moran, Eagan High School - MN

== Choosing a piece ==
When choosing a piece, competitors may use any form of published material - whether it be a dictionary, movie script or a novel. Pieces that tend to be more popular, though, are movie scripts, novels and plays. Picking a piece that can be cut down to ten minutes can be very difficult, but it is important that when choosing a piece, performers keep in mind how they might go about cutting it down. In addition, it is very important that performers pick out pieces that are not commonly done. According to Darren C. Goins, picking a "fresh" piece is one of the best ways to ensure a successful season. One very good source student can turn to in order to find good pieces is winning pieces of play writing contests and such.

== Humorous Interpretation in Performance ==
Pieces must be memorized in Humorous Interpretation. No scripts are allowed. The number of characters that can be present in the piece is entirely dependent upon the competitor's level of ability. It may range anywhere from one character to multiple characters. Each different character is distinguished by a different posture and character voice. Throughout the piece, competitors switch back and forth between characters with character pops.

Pops are a quick transition between characters where the performer quickly re-adjusts his or her body to the appropriate character. There are different styles and ways of popping in and out of characters. A different style of pops is one that is more of a slide into the other character, it is much less abrupt. Regardless of how one decides to go about alternating between characters, though, the one thing performers must make sure of is that it is very clear they are portraying a different character. This doesn't have to be done with just posture alone, a competitor may also utilize different voices to differentiate between characters.

The voices that represent each character should be vastly different and distinct. Because competitors are not allowed to use props or costumes, they must pantomime a prop when necessary. When performing, competitors are expected to dress in business attire and be professional. Humorous Interpretation rounds will often have anywhere between five and seven competitors. Competitors are ranked from lowest to highest in a round, with the lowest score of one being the best rank in the round.

== See also ==
Dramatic Interpretation
