= Duo Interpretation =

Duo Interpretation, or often simply called Duo Interp, or just Duo, is an official speech event of Stoa USA, the National Speech and Debate Association, the National Catholic Forensics League, National Christian Forensics and Communications Association, American Forensics Association, and the National Forensics Association. The event involves a pair of performers acting out a literary piece or program under certain constraints, including not making eye contact nor touching their partner, and not using props. Pieces used often include published books, movies, short stories, plays, or poems. Participants may cut anything out of their piece, but cannot add any dialogue. This event can either be dramatic or humorous.

== Performance ==
Props and costumes are not allowed, and the performers rely on things such as pantomime to convey what is happening. Duo Interpretation differs from the other events in the sense that the most important element is how well the duo partners work with each other. Partners are not allowed to look at each other or touch each other, so they must come up with other means to convey two characters talking to each other, physically interacting with each other, etc. Like in other interpretation events, the competitors will often pick a point on the wall in front of them to look at, pretending it is their subject. The stance is key in Duo Interpretation, where even the slightest shift could indicate a change.

Timing is also crucial when it comes to conveying physical interactions. For instance, if one partner lifts and swipes their hand as if to slap someone, the other partner must flinch and "be hit" in response. These movements must be timed carefully and are arguably the most challenging aspect of the event. Teams will often create complex "choreography" or "tech" (the term differs based on region) to showcase how well they can perform together.

Interpretation is highly valued in this event. Performances can be dramatic, humorous, or a blend of both. Performers often twist the meanings of words for comic effect or play on an unintentional pun. Other common ways to change the meaning of the text are to sing, dance, gesture, or simply change the tone of your voice.

Some movements, such as lying on the floor or kneeling with both legs, are prohibited at some tournaments, but performers can get around these rules by keeping one limb raised.

A duo can be no longer than ten minutes (any team exceeding ten minutes is given a thirty-second grace period before having any points deducted. There is no definite time minimum, but the unofficial consensus is that seven minutes is a good minimum time.

== Elements of the Duo ==
The duo usually begins with a teaser or short "taste" of the forthcoming duo. Typically, though there is no rule governing the order of these elements or their length, this lasts 1 to 2 minutes before the performers break character to perform their self-written "intro". The intro serves to introduce the piece and its author, as well as provide the performers to simultaneously present the theme or storyline of their piece and infuse their own creativity. After the intro, which is usually brief due to original word restrictions, the duo resumes through its end.
