= National Catholic Forensic League =

- Type: Non Profit Organization
- Founded: 1951
- Key people: Katy Cecil, President; Marc Rischitelli , First Vice President; Carolyn Cook, Second Vice President; Susan Peebles, Secretary"; Greg Cunningham, "Treasurer; Crawford Leavoy, Publicity Director / Recording Secretary; Roland Burdett, National Tournament Director
- Website: http://ncfl.org

The National Catholic Forensic League (NCFL) is a nonprofit speech and debate league that was formed in 1951. It is organized into regions that correspond to Latin Catholic dioceses. Member schools include both public and parochial high schools. The NCFL recruits member schools in both the United States and Canada. As of January, 2011, there were 65 active dioceses with NCFL leagues.

The NCFL sponsors the Grand National Speech and Debate Tournament held each year over Memorial Day weekend. It offers an array of events similar but not identical to those of the National Speech and Debate Association.

== NCFL Tournament ==
Due to the Coronavirus, the organization was forced to not host their national tournament. This was incredibly historic as it was the first time in history the NCFL was unable to do so. After virtually hosting the tournament online in 2021, normal operation procedures followed in the time since then, as of March 2024.

== Richard Gaudette Service Award ==
The Richard Gaudette Service Award was established in 2008 in honor of the NCFL's Executive Secretary and Treasurer of 24 years. The principle which guides this award is service.

The individual/group nominated must be or have been a member of the NCFL who promoted service as well as "leadership through speech" at either a local, state or national level. The committee of seven which determines the award's recipient will be made up of the NCFL First Vice President and 6 others selected by the NCFL President. Nominations will be accepted until January 10, with the award/s being presented at the NCFL Grand National Tournament Award Ceremony.

Past recipients include:

2025 CRAWFORD LEAVOY & ANGELIQUE RONALD Equity Advocates	2024 - Champion Host Award MICHAEL & BERNADETTE COLLETTI Archdiocese of Chicago	2024 ROBERTA HYLAND Diocese of Washington

2023 SARAH DONNELLY Diocese of Worcester	2021 CHRIS PALMER Archdiocese of Boston	2021 CHARLES SLOAT Archdiocese of New York

2019 STEVE SEXTON Archdiocese of Milwaukee	2018 CATHERINE LUHR Diocese of Buffalo	2017 KATY CECIL with Garland & Ruth Blair Archdiocese of Louisville

2017 KIM MATHER with Garland & Ruth Blair Archdiocese of Louisville	2016 "GRANDMA" JULIA STANZIONE Archdiocese of New York	2015 MICHAEL NAILOR Diocese of Scranton

2014 MICHAEL COLLETTI Archdiocese of Chicago	2013 BARBARA FONTENOT Archdiocese of New Orleans	2013 R. SCOTT WALDROP Diocese of Biloxi

2012 BROTHER GEORGE ZEHNLE Diocese of Rockville Center	2011 DEBBIE SIMON Archdiocese of Boston	2010 ROLAND BURDETT, III Diocese of Arlington

2009 RON STEINHORST Diocese of Green Bay	2009 BROTHER RENE STERNER Archdiocese of Philadelphia	2008 RICHARD GAUDETTE Diocese of Worcester

== Events ==
- Dramatic Performance – A ten-minute memorized performance of a dramatic or humorous selection of literature.
- Duo Interpretation of Literature – A ten-minute memorized performance of a dialogue, story, or script by two performers, who are required to maintain off-stage focus and to not look at or touch each other.
- Oral Interpretation of Literature – A ten-minute reading event, alternating between Prose and Poetry each round.
- Extemporaneous Speaking – A seven-minute analytical / persuasive speech on a question of current events, given with only 30 minutes' prior notice.
- Oratorical Declamation – A ten-minute memorized performance of a historical speech, commencement address or former competition speech to be delivered as if it were the speaker's own address. Limited to freshmen and sophomores.
- Original Oratory – A ten-minute memorized original speech delivered to inspire or persuade the audience.
- Lincoln-Douglas Debate – 1v1 Value debate on a topic chosen by the NCFL specifically for the Grand National Tournament. Four Minutes of preparation time is allotted to each debater per debate. The focus of the debate is on the philosophical ramifications of affirming or negating the resolution.
- Policy Debate – Two-person, switch-side, cross-examination debate, with five minutes of preparation time per team, on the national topic.
- Public Forum Debate – A team event that advocates or rejects a position posed by the resolution. The focus of the debate is a clash of ideas in a persuasive manner that can be understood by a "lay" judge. Side and speaking order are assigned to each team every round in order to ensure students have the opportunity to debate both sides of a topic.
- Student Congress – Mock legislative sessions where students debate bills and resolutions submitted by schools from participating dioceses.

== National tournament sites ==
- 1952 Brooklyn, New York
- 1953 Pittsburgh, Pennsylvania
- 1954 Cleveland, Ohio
- 1955 Brooklyn, New York
- 1956 Pittsburgh, Pennsylvania
- 1957 Philadelphia, Pennsylvania
- 1958 Chicago, Illinois
- 1959 Washington, District of Columbia
- 1960 New York, New York
- 1961 Baltimore, Maryland
- 1962 Miami, Florida
- 1963 Pittsburgh, Pennsylvania
- 1964 Denver, Colorado
- 1965 Brooklyn, New York
- 1966 Miami, Florida
- 1967 Camden, New Jersey
- 1968 Chicago, Illinois
- 1969 Washington, District of Columbia
- 1970 Miami, Florida
- 1971 New Orleans, Louisiana
- 1972 Pittsburgh, Pennsylvania
- 1973 Chicago, Illinois
- 1974 New Orleans, Louisiana
- 1975 Philadelphia, Pennsylvania
- 1976 Detroit, Michigan
- 1977 Milwaukee, Wisconsin
- 1978 Washington, District of Columbia
- 1979 Milwaukee, Wisconsin
- 1980 Boston/Worcester, Massachusetts
- 1981 New York, New York
- 1982 Detroit, Michigan
- 1983 Chicago, Illinois
- 1984 Cincinnati, Ohio
- 1985 Miami, Florida
- 1986 Baltimore, Maryland
- 1987 Buffalo, New York
- 1988 New Orleans, Louisiana
- 1989 Philadelphia, Pennsylvania
- 1990 Chicago, Illinois
- 1991 New York City, New York
- 1992 Arlington, Virginia
- 1993 Boca Raton, Florida
- 1994 Oshkosh, Wisconsin
- 1995 Chicago, Illinois
- 1996 Topeka, Kansas
- 1997 Baltimore, Maryland
- 1998 Detroit, Michigan
- 1999 Chicago, Illinois
- 2000 Rochester, New York
- 2001 New York City, New York
- 2002 Pittsburgh, Pennsylvania
- 2003 Arlington, Virginia
- 2004 Boston, Massachusetts
- 2005 Milwaukee, Wisconsin
- 2006 Chicago, Illinois
- 2007 Houston, Texas
- 2008 Appleton, Wisconsin
- 2009 Albany, New York
- 2010 Omaha, Nebraska
- 2011 Washington, D.C.
- 2012 Baltimore, Maryland
- 2013 Philadelphia, Pennsylvania
- 2014 Chicago, Illinois
- 2015 Fort Lauderdale, Florida
- 2016 Sacramento, California
- 2017 Louisville, Kentucky
- 2018 Washington, D.C.
- 2019 Milwaukee, Wisconsin
- 2020 Chicago, Illinois
- 2021 Online
- 2022 Washington, D.C.
- 2023 Louisville, Kentucky
- 2024 Chicago, Illinois
- 2025 Chicago, Illinois
- 2026 Washington, D.C.
- 2027 Minneapolis, Minnesota
- 2028 Lafayette, Louisiana

=== National tournament director ===
Past National Tournament Directors

Director	Years
Br. Rene Sterner, F.S.C.	1972–1992
James Lyness Loyola School New York, New York	1992–2002
Ron Steinhorst New London High School New London, Wisconsin	2002–2006
Roland Burdett Washington Arlington Catholic Forensic League Arlington, Virginia	2006–present

== Past NCFL National Champions ==
=== Congressional Debate ===
- 1992 — J. Matthew Knight, Lake Highland Preparatory School, FL
- 1994 — Chris Dorworth, Colonial High School, FL
- 1995 – Bill Gallagher, Xavier High School, NY
- 1996 – Duarte Gerladino, Brooklyn Technical High School, NY
- 1997 – Sean Carmody, Pleasantville High School, NY
- 1998 – Seth Green, Taravella High School, FL
- 1999 – Matt Brennan, Iona Preparatory, NY
- 2000 – Ian Amelkin, Stoneman Douglas High School
- 2001 – Matt Spritz, Nova High School, FL
- 2002 – Scott Jacobsin, Nova High School, FL
- 2003 – Daniel Chapanian, Shrewsbury High School, MA
- 2004 – Matt Turetzky, Nova High School, FL
- 2005 – Results unavailable
- 2006 – Colin Outerbridge, Trinity Preparatory, FL
- 2007 – Sundeep Iyer, Ridge High School, NJ
- 2008 – Ben Berkman, Nova High School
- 2009 – Harlan Downs Tepper, Stuyvesant High School, NY
- 2010 – Alex Smyk, Ridge High School, NJ
- 2011 – Morgan Baskin, American Heritage, FL
- 2012 – Results unavailable
- 2013 – Michael Cervino, Ridge High School, NJ
- 2014 – Nic Gerard, Shrewsbury High School, MA
- 2015 – Carla Troconis, East Chapel Hill, NC
- 2016 — Katherine Klienle, Ridge High School, NJ
- 2017 — Muhammad Naeen, Western High School, FL
- 2018 — Gabrielle Cabeza, Western High School, FL
- 2019 — Nathan Felmus, Bronx High School of Science, NY
- 2021 — Olivia Pasquerella, Loyola School, NY
- 2022 — Ben Bressette, Broad Run High School, VA
- 2023 — Kadin Collier, Oak Grove High School, MS
- 2024 — Rhys Adams, Milton Academy, MA
- 2025 — Solomon Naraine, Rockhurst High School, MO
- 2026 — Akram Younis, Suncoast Community High School, FL

=== Lincoln-Douglas Debate ===
- 1988 – Lisa Nass, Miami Beach High School, Miami Beach, FL
- 1989 – David Kennedy, Regis High School, New York, NY
- 1990 – Jeremi Suri, Stuyvesant High School, New York, NY
- 1991 – Mark Wunderlich, Walter Johnson High School, Bethesda, MD
- 1992 – Jerry Vildostegui, Miami Beach High School, Miami Beach, FL
- 1993 – Christopher J. Regan, Bishop Kearney High School, Irondequoit, NY
- 1994 – Elizabeth Rogers, Shenendehowa High School, Clifton Park, NY
- 1995 – Derek D. Smith, Winston Churchill High School, Potomac, MD
- 1996 – Randall Martinez, Christopher Columbus High School, Miami, Florida
- 1997 – Mac Hawkins, Lagrange High School, Lake Charles, LA
- 1998 – Chetan Hertzig, Lexington High School, Lexington, MA
- 1999 – Elizabeth O'Connor, Hunter College High School, New York, NY
- 2000 – Kevin Farrell, Elk Grove High School, Chicago, Illinois
- 2001 – Benjamin Rothstein, Milton Academy, Boston, MA
- 2002 – Duncan Cooper, St. John's Preparatory School, Boston, MA
- 2003 – Nina Thanawala, Ridge High School, Basking Ridge, NJ
- 2004 – Tara Tedrow, Celebration High School, Orlando, FL
- 2005 – Tara Tedrow, Celebration High School, Orlando, FL
- 2006 – Caitlin Halpern, W.T. Woodson High School, Arlington, VA
- 2007 – Ryan Zehner, Saint Joseph's Preparatory School, Philadelphia, PA
- 2008 – Ellen Noble, Walt Whitman High School, Bethesda, MD
- 2009 – Karlyn Gorski, Perkioman Valley High School, Philadelphia, PA
- 2010 – Stephanie Franklin, Walt Whitman High School, Bethesda, MD
- 2011 – Allison Douglis, Ridge High School, Basking Ridge, NJ
- 2012 – Katelyn Sheehan, Lake Braddock Secondary School, Arlington, VA
- 2013 – Austin Cohen, Elk Lake High School, Dimock, PA
- 2014 – Danny DeBois, Harrison High School, Harrison, NY
- 2015 – Joey Schnide, Evanston Township High School, Evanston, IL
- 2016 – Nicole Kastelic, Hawken School, Gates Mills, OH
- 2017 – Maya Arora, Cape Fear Academy, Wilmington, NC
- 2018 – Eva Lamberson, Canfield High School, Canfield, OH
- 2019 – Maya Arora, Cape Fear Academy, Wilmington, NC
- 2021 – Elias Altman, Myers Park High School, Charlotte, NC
- 2022 – Ryan Si, Hawken School, Gates Mills, OH
- 2023 – Robert Liu, Durham Academy, Durham, NC
- 2024 – Anthony Scarmozzino, Chaminade High School, Mineola, NY
- 2025 – Noah Arthur, Concord-Carlisle High School, Concord, MA
- 2026 – Brooke Gemechu, Hawken School, Gates Mills, OH

=== Public Forum Debate ===
- 2007 – Dennis Howe and Robert Wyllie, Regis High School, New York, NY
- 2008- Jonathan Freidman and Jeanine Sinan-Singh, Trinity Preparatory School, Florida
- 2009 – Danny Welch and Will Miller, Lake Highland Preparatory School, Orlando, Florida
- 2010 – Bud Peters and Thomas Pigott
- 2011 – Brian Grumka and Thomas Pigott
- 2012 - Kyle Newman and Michael Adams, Pinecrest HS, North Carolina
- 2013 – Cameron Silvergate and Ethan Goldstein
- 2014 – Tim Perevozchikov and Zach Kirsch, Hawken School, Ohio
- 2015 – Ben Kessler and Jakob Urda, Stuyvesant HS, New York
- 2016 - Eitan Ezra and Harrison Hurt, Poly Prep Country Day School, New York City, NY
- 2017 - Atticus Nelson and Silas Nelson, DeSoto Central High School, Southaven, MS
- 2018 - Alyson Brusie and Robert Linck, Oxbridge Academy of the Palm Beaches, West Palm Beach, FL
- 2021 - William Pan and Arvindh Manian, Providence High School, Charlotte NC
- 2022 - Alex Huang and Michael Hansen, Durham Academy, Durham, NC
- 2023 - Julien Benchek and Mehul Lakhanpal, Hawken School, OH

=== Policy Debate ===
- 2014 - Anav Sharma and Aditya Rout, St. Francis Mountain View HS, Mountain View, CA
- 2015 - Henry Walter and Ali Dastjerdi, Shawnee Mission East HS, Prairie Village, KS
- 2016 - Saif Bajwa and Daniel Birzer, Blue Valley West HS, Overland Park, KS
- 2017 – Stephen Lowe and Danish Kahn, Blue Valley Southwest HS, Overland Park, KS
- 2018 - Sumaya Hussaini and Rachel Holzer, Blue Valley Southwest HS, Overland Park, KS
- 2019 - Jet Semrick and Luke Bledsoe, Shawnee Mission East HS, Prairie Village, KS
- 2021 - Jasleen Randhawa and Daksh Jain, Silver Creek HS, San Jose, CA
- 2022 - Clare Bradley and Brooklynn Hato, Shawnee Mission South, Overland Park, KS
- 2023 - Jeremiah Rimpson and Maddie Augustine, Shawnee Mission South, Overland Park, KS
- 2024 - Nevaeh Sencion and Saidah Ervin, Baltimore City College, Baltimore, MD
- 2025 - Sophie Leonard and Lucy Pace, Shawnee Mission East HS, Prairie Village, KS
- 2026 - Zahaan Batliboi and Sasha Londoner, Poly Prep Country Day School, Brooklyn, NY

== See also ==
- Competitive debate in the United States
