= Original Oratory =

Competitive event

Original Oratory (often shortened to "OO") is a competitive event in the National Speech and Debate Association, Stoa USA, National Catholic Forensic League, and other high school forensic competitions in which competitors deliver an original, factual speech on a subject of their choosing. Though the rules for the category change from organization to organization, a speech must generally be written and memorized by the performer and should be no more than ten minutes in length, and at most only 150 words can be quoted. The finished speech must be approved by the National Speech and Debate Association. This speech is frequently highly persuasive and is normally about a slightly controversial topic. An orator is given free choice of subject and judged solely on the effectiveness of development and presentation.

Oratory topics are usually related to current problems in the world, and are delivered in a persuasive way as to motivate the audience to make a choice. However, this may not always be the case. Some speeches may alert the audience of an imminent threat or inspire them to act now to initiate change. According to the National Speech and Debate Association, the competitor is judged on:

- the degree to which the inspiration or purpose of the speech elicits a reaction from the audience.
- gestures performed by the speaker to help the audience visualize ideas better.
- evidence which supports the speaker's assertions.
- the veracity of the speech.

== Judges ==
Judges are typically Original Oratory competitors, coaches, sponsors, parents, or friends of the host tournament. Coaches are prohibited from judging their own schools, and alumni competitors must wait two years before they are allowed to judge the school from which they graduated. In some states and leagues, alumni are not allowed to judge the school from which they graduated for up to four years to prevent biased judgement on one's former teammates.
