= List of presidents of Washington College =

Presidents of Washington College

President of Washington College
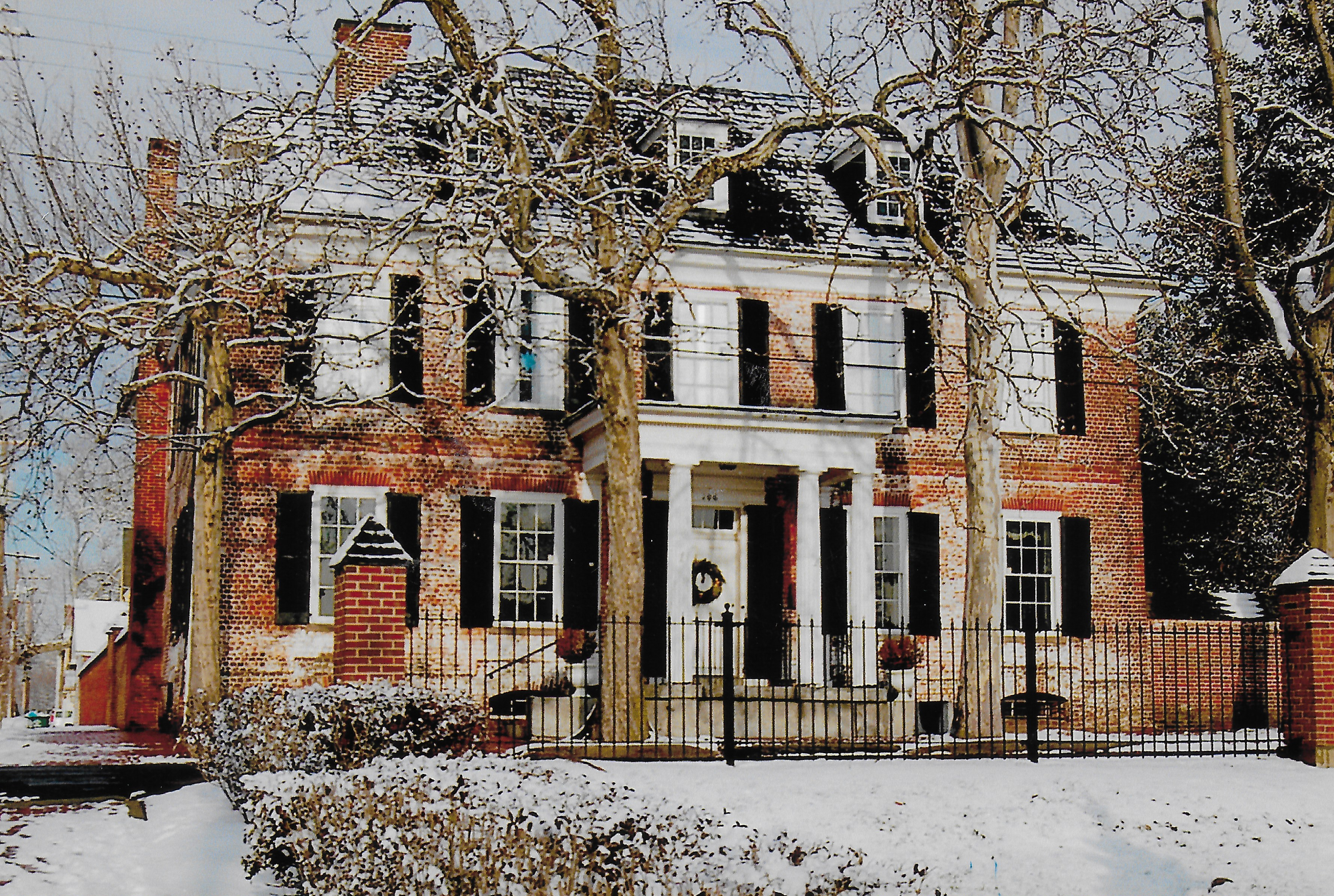
- The Hynson-Ringgold House
- Incumbent; Bryan Matthews since 2026
- Residence: Hynson-Ringgold House
- Appointer: Washington College Board of Visitors and Governors
- Inaugural holder: William Smith
- Formation: 1782
- Website: Office of the President

Washington College is a private liberal arts college in Chestertown, Maryland, which is on the Eastern Shore of Maryland. The college was founded in 1782 by William Smith, but is the successor institution to the earlier Kent County Free School, which was founded in 1732. From the college's founding until 1922 the executive officer of the college was known as the principal of the college; subsequently, the executive officer is the president of the college. (Note: The 1922 change to Washington College's Charter changed the official title of the office (Dumschott 1980, p. 180), but Watts (1894, p. 94) first refers to the position as the president with Charles W. Reid's election in 1889 and Dumschott (1980, p. 146) starts using president and principal interchangeably with James W. Cain's election in 1903.) While the title changed, the office is considered to be the same and officeholders who were referred to as principals by their contemporaries are now referred to as presidents. (Note: In contemporary documents such as Thompson (2000), the college refers to William Smith as the first president of the college. Dumschott (1980) and primary documents from the era, however, refer to him as the first principal.) Before the title change in 1922, the president of Washington College was the president of the Board of Visitors and Governors; since 1922, that position is the chair of the Board of Visitors and Governors.

The president of Washington College is appointed by the Board of Visitors and Governors and serves at the pleasure of the board. They are the chief executive officer and chief spokesperson of the college. As a part of their role, they are a voting member of the college's faculty and ex officio member of the Board of Visitors and Governors. There is no fixed compensation or pay scale for the position; each president negotiates a contract independently with the board. As a part of the position's compensation, the President of Washington College is given access to the Hynson-Ringgold House, which has been the official residence of the Washington College president since 1944.

At least 32 people have been the president of Washington College since 1782, four of whom have been interim presidents. (Note: It is unknown who the principal was between 1805 and 1813.) Of the 32 presidents, two, Joseph McLain and Bryan Matthews, were alumni of the college and only one, Sheila Bair, was a woman. The presidents of the college have been drawn from a variety of areas including religion, military service, governmental service, and academia. Six Washington College presidents were ordained in the Episcopal Church or the Methodist Protestant Church before their term. Several were also the rector of Emanuel Parish in Chestertown concurrent to their term as president. Washington College presidents have come from many parts of public life. Two were engaged in military service before their term and four were in public service. A singular president, Kurt M. Landgraf, was working in the private sector before his term. Most of the remaining presidents were academics before becoming president of the college. Three were presidents of other colleges, eight were academic administrators, six were faculty members at other colleges, and four were faculty members at Washington College before their terms.

== Principals and presidents of Washington College ==
- A "–" indicates that the individual served as Interim President.

#	Photo	Name	Term begin	Term end	Previous experience	Notes	Ref(s)
1	White male with gray hair in academic robes with preaching tabs	William Smith	1782	1789	Priest in the Episcopal Church; Provost of the Academy and College of Philadelphia	Founder of Washington College and St. John's College.	
2	Profile of a male's head	Colin Ferguson	1792	1805	Priest in the Episcopal Church; Professor of Languages, Mathematics, and Natural Philosophy at Washington College		
–	–	–	1805	1813	–	The name of the principal between 1805 and 1813 is unknown.	
3		Hugh McGuire	1813	1815	Teacher at St. John's College (Note: Hugh McGuire's academic rank and area of study is unknown.)		
4		Joab G. Cooper	1816	1817	Priest in the Episcopal Church		
– (Note: Gerard E. Stack is referred to as an Interim President by Watts (1894), Dumschott (1980), and Thompson (2000), however the college's website calls him the 5th president. Because of this, the numbering here conflicts with the numbering that Washington College uses.)		Gerard E. Stack	1817	1818	Temporary professor of Greek and Latin at Dickinson College		
5	White male in a dark suit holding a book	Francis Waters	1818	1823	Minister in the Methodist Protestant Church	Also the 9th Principal of Washington College	
6	White male in a dark cassock with preaching tabs	Timothy Clowes	1823	1829	Priest in the Episcopal Church		
7	White male with dark hair and long sideburns in a dark suit sitting at a desk with an open book	Peter Clark	1829	1832	"spent three years at Dartmouth College"		
8		Richard W. Ringgold	1832	1854	Member of the Maryland House of Delegates		
9	White male in a dark suit holding a book	Francis Waters	1854	1860	Minister in the Methodist Protestant Church	Also the 5th Principal of Washington College	
10		Andrew J. Sutton	1860	1867	Priest in the Episcopal Church; Professor of Ancient and Modern Languages at Washington College		
11		Robert C. Berkeley	1867	1873	Served in the Confederate Army as a Quartermaster Sergeant in Longstreet's Corps		
12	White male with dark hair in a dark suit	William J. Rivers	1873	1887	Professor of Greek at the University of South Carolina		
13		Thomas N. Williams	1887	1889	Superintendent of Delaware Public Schools		
14	Mostly bald white male with a large goatee in a dark suit	Charles W. Reid	1889	1903	Professor of Greek and German at St. John's College		
15	White male with white hair and a mustache in a dark suit	James W. Cain	1903	1918	Professor of English and Political Economy at St. John's College		
–	Professor of Mathematics, Dean, and Acting President of Washington College.	J.S. William Jones	1918	1919	Dean and Professor of Mathematics at Washington College		
16	Clarence P. Gould, President of Washington College from 1919 to 1923.	Clarence P. Gould	1919	1923	Professor of History at College of Wooster	The title of the chief executive of Washington College changed from Principal to President in 1922	
17	White male with dark hair in a dark suit	Paul E. Titsworth	1923	1933	Dean of the College of Liberal Arts at Alfred University		
18	White male with dark hair and a thin beard in a dark suit	Gilbert W. Mead	1933	1949	Dean of Birmingham–Southern College		
– (Note: Fredrick G. Livingood is referred to as an Interim President by Dumschott (1980), but is not listed on Washington College's website.)	=White male in dark suit	Fredrick G. Livingood	1949	1950	Dean of Washington College and Professor of Education at Washington College		
19	White male in academic dress wearing a mortarboard	Daniel Z. Gibson	1950	1970	Dean of Franklin & Marshall College		
20	Charles J. Merdinger, President of Washington College from 1970 to 1973.	Charles J. Merdinger	1970	1973	Commanding Officer of the Western Division of the Naval Facilities Engineering Command		
21	White male with dark hair in a tan suit	Joseph McLain	1973	1981	Professor of Chemistry at Washington College	First alumnus of Washington College to become president.	
–	White male with dark hair and large dark glasses in a white shirt and dark tie	Garry E. Clarke	1981	1982	Dean of Washington College and a professor of Music at Washington College		
22	White male in profile	Douglass Cater	1982	1990	Vice Chairman of the London Observer; Special Assistant to Lyndon B. Johnson		
23		Charles H. Trout	1990	1995	Provost of Colgate University		
24		John S. Toll	1995	2004	President of Stony Brook University; Chancellor of the University System of Maryland		
25		Baird Tipson	2004	2010	President of Wittenberg University; President of Gettysburg College		
26	White male with dark hair in a gray suit with an American flag in the background	Mitchell Reiss	2010	2014	United States Special Envoy for Northern Ireland		
–		Jay Griswold	2014	2015	Chair of the Washington College Board of Visitors and Governors		
27	White woman with blonde hair in a green jacket and orange shirt	Sheila Bair	2015	2017	Chair of the Federal Deposit Insurance Corporation		
28		Kurt M. Landgraf	2017	2020	CEO of DuPont; Member of the New Jersey Commission on Higher Education		
–		Wayne B. Powell	2020	2021	President of Lenoir-Rhyne University		
29		Michael J. Sosulski	2021	2025	Provost of Wofford College		
30		Bryan Matthews	2025		Former Director of Athletics and Interim Vice President at Washington College	Current officeholder. Began as interim president in 2025.	

== Timeline ==
Principal of Washington College • Acting Principal of Washington College • President of Washington College • Acting President of Washington College
