= Cato's Letters (disambiguation) =

Cato's Letters were essays by British writers John Trenchard and Thomas Gordon, first published from 1720 to 1723.

Cato's Letters could also refer to:

- Cato's Letters (loyalist), a series of essays arguing against American independence in the Pennsylvania Gazette published in 1776
- Cato's Letters (Antifederalist), a series of Anti-Federalist letters to the New York Journal in 1787 and 1788
