= Baird Tipson =

25th President of Washington College
- In office 2004–2010
- Preceded by: John S. Toll
- Succeeded by: Mitchell Reiss

President of Wittenberg University
- In office 1995–2004
- Preceded by: William A. Kinnison
- Succeeded by: Mark H. Erickson

Personal details
- Born: L. Baird Tipson
- Education: Princeton University (AB); Yale University (PhD)

L. Baird Tipson is an American academic and college administrator.

== Education ==
Tipson graduated from The Hill School in 1961. He earned an A.B. degree from Princeton University in 1965 and a Ph.D. in religious studies from Yale University in 1972.

== Career ==
After an initial career as a professor of religion at the University of Virginia and Central Michigan University, Tipson entered academic administration. He served as provost at Gettysburg College from 1987 to 1995. He served as president of Wittenberg University from 1995 to 2004 and Washington College from 2004 to 2010. He retired to Gettysburg, Pennsylvania, in 2010 and resumed teaching and scholarly research as an adjunct professor at Gettysburg College.

Tipson's extensive study of early Protestantism in Connecticut, Hartford Puritanism - Thomas Hooker, Samuel Stone, and Their Terrifying God, was published by Oxford University Press in 2015. His second book, Inward Baptism : The Theological Origins of Evangelism, was published in 2020 by the same press.
