= Frank Waters (disambiguation) =

Frank Waters (1902–1995) was an American writer.

Frank, Francis, or Franklin Waters may also refer to:

== Clergy ==
- Francis G. Waters (1792–1868), Methodist minister from Baltimore, Maryland, U.S., founding member of the Methodist Protestant Church
- Reverend Thomas Franklin Waters (1851–1919), editor of the Massachusetts Magazine, and founder of the Ipswich Historical Society

== Performing artists ==
- Frank Waters (actor) (1915–1972), Australian actor from Adelaide
- Frank Waters, former stage name of Abhinav Bastakoti (1999–), now known as Curtis Waters, a Nepal-born Canadian-American musician

== Public officials ==
- Frank Waters (politician), Francis John Waters (1907–1990), Australian politician, 1932–1938 Queensland Legislative Assembly member for Kelvin Grove
- Frank J. Waters Sr., the 1935–1938 representative of California's 58th State Assembly district
- Frank J. Waters Jr., the 1939–1947 representative of California's 58th State Assembly district
- Frank Waters, a Fine Gael and then independent candidate in the 1948 and 1951 Irish general elections for the Longford–Westmeath constituency of the 13th and 14th Dáil Éireann
- Franklin Levi Waters (1829–?), a member of the Massachusetts House of Representatives' 2nd Franklin district in the 1888 Massachusetts legislature
- Hugh Franklin Waters (1932–2002), federal judge in the United States District Court for the Western District of Arkansas

== Sports players ==
- Frank Waters (rugby union), Frank Henry Waters (1908–1954), Scottish rugby player
- Muddy Waters (American football), Franklin Dean "Muddy" Waters Jr. (1923–2006), American football player and coach
- William Francis "Bill" Waters (1897–1968), Australian bushwalker and cross-country skier, Scouts Victoria's 1930–1965 Headquarters Commissioner for Rover Scouts

== Fictional characters ==
- Agent Frank Waters, a character in CSI: NY, S8 E9 "Means to an End" (2011), played by Michael Weston
- Frankie Xavier Waters, a mechanic in the TV series Viper, played by Joe Nipote

== See also ==
- Frank "Muddy" Waters Stadium, American football venue in Hillsdale, Michigan
- Frank Walters (1860–1922), Australian Test cricketer
- Frank Watters (1934–2020), Australian gallerist and artist
