= Marcus Eriksson =

Mark, Markus or Marcus Eriksson may refer to:

- Mark Eriksson, American experimental physicist at UW–Madison since 1999
- Marcus Eriksson (ice hockey) (born 1976), Swedish ice hockey player
- Marcus Eriksson (basketball) (born 1993), Swedish basketball player
- Markus Eriksson (curler) (born 1987), Swedish curler
- Markus Eriksson (tennis) (born 1989), Swedish tennis player

== See also ==
- Marcus Ericsson (born 1990), Swedish race car driver
- Mark Erickson (disambiguation)
