= Lester Markel =

American journalist (1894–1977)

- Born: January 9, 1894; New York City, New York
- Died: October 23, 1977; New York City, New York
- Occupations: Journalist, editor, freedom of the press advocate
- Spouse: Meta Edman (m. 1917)
- Children: 1
- Parent(s): Jacob Leo and Lillian (Hecht) Markel

Lester Markel (January 9, 1894 – October 23, 1977) was an American journalist, editor, lecturer, and a significant advocate for the freedom of the press. He received a Pulitzer Prize in 1953.

== Early life ==
Lester Markel's parents were Jacob Leo Markel and Lillian (Hecht), both German immigrants. He married Meta Edman (b. 1895 - d. 1984) on April 3, 1917, at the Hotel Astor with Rev. Dr. Henry Pereira Mendes officiating; Arnold Markel, a brother of Lester, was best man and Mrs. A.J. Markel was the matron of honor. Lester and Meta Markel had one daughter, Helen (b. 1918 - d. 1990), who was Articles Editor for Ladies' Home Journal and McCalls in the 1960s and 1970s. Helen Markel married Jack Stewart, head of the Book Division at the New York Times; Lester Markel's grandson is Mark L. Stewart, a prolific writer and editor.

His brother-in-law was Irwin Edman, the famous Columbia University philosopher, who dedicated his masterpiece "Philosopher's Holiday" to Meta and Lester.

Lester Markel attended City College of New York for two years and received a Bachelor of Letters degree (Litt. B.) from Columbia University, N.Y., in 1914.

== Newspaper career ==
=== The New York Tribune ===
Markel began his career in the newspaper business as a sportswriter and Linotype machine operator for the Northside News, a neighborhood paper in the Bronx. Markel was subsequently hired as a reporter for the New York Tribune and progressed to the positions of city editor and night editor. In 1919 he was promoted to assistant managing editor of the Tribune.

=== The New York Times ===
In 1923, Adolph S. Ochs hired Markel as editor for what was then the unremarkable Sunday department of the New York Times. Editor of the Sunday edition of the New York Times from 1923 to 1964, Markel acknowledged that he was a "tough" editor while others considered him "intense and autocratic" and "prickly." He reorganized the Sunday edition of the New York Times, creating sections including the "Book Review" and "Arts and Leisure", thus establishing the familiar sectional-format of the Sunday newspaper that subsequently would be emulated by editors across the country. During the reorganization, Markel also established the "Review of the Week" section which earned him and the Times a Pulitzer Prize in 1953 with a special citation "for the section of its Sunday newspaper edited by Lester Markel and headed, 'Review of the Week,' which for seventeen years has brought enlightenment and intelligent commentary to its readers." As editor of The New York Times Magazine, he encouraged using the magazine as a forum for new ideas explicated with extended essays by noted personalities of the day.

=== Friendship with Marilyn Monroe ===
Lester Markel enjoyed a friendship with Marilyn Monroe with whom he engaged in political discussions of the day. A letter from Monroe to Markel was discovered in the early 80s. Dated March 29, 1960, Monroe began the letter with "Lester Dear, Here I am still in bed. I've been lying here--thinking even of you." Monroe continued with her views on presidential politics, with comments on Adlai Stevenson, John F. Kennedy, Richard Nixon and others. She concluded her letter with "I didn't want you to get a glimpse of me until I was wearing my Somali leopard. I want you to think of me as a predatory animal."

== Retirement ==
In 1963, 37-year-old Arthur Ochs Sulzberger became publisher of The New York Times. The following year, Sulzberger ordered that the daily edition and Sunday edition come under a single executive editor, Turner Catledge; Sulzberger felt that the separate editions competed inefficiently with each other and his decision to unify them under a single editor was made without prior notification to Markel. Subsequently, Markel became an associate editor of The New York Times and head of its department of public affairs. Markel and Catledge both retired from the Times in 1968.

== The International Press Institute ==
In October, 1950, Lester Markel brought 34 editors from 15 countries to Columbia University in New York City for an initial discussion regarding the exchange of information among nations and the freedom of the press. He subsequently convinced the American Society of Newspaper Editors to establish a five-person commission to further explore these topics. Markel penned the objectives for the new organization that eventually would become the International Press Institute: 1. The furtherance and safeguarding of freedom of the press, by which is meant: free access to the news, free transmission of the news, free publication of newspapers, free expression of views; 2. The achievement of understanding amongst journalists and so among peoples; 3. The promotion of the free exchange of accurate and balanced news among nations; and 4. the improvement of the practices of journalism.

Markel organized the financing to support the fledgling organization, initially raising $20,000 from about 20 newspapers. In addition, he received a $150,000 grant from the Ford Foundation and a $120,000 grant for the Rockefeller Foundation that helped keep the organization afloat for the first three years. With finances secure, the formal establishment of the International Press Institute became official on May 16, 1951.

== Television: News in Perspective ==
From 1963 to 1970, Markel edited and moderated a television program, "News in Perspective," a nationally broadcast public-program which reviewed and discussed the most important news of the week. He was joined on the program by prominent New York Times colleagues Clifton Daniel, James Reston, and Tom Wicker, Pulitzer-prize winner Max Frankel, and Washington-insider Douglass Cater.

== Post-retirement years ==
After his retirement in 1968 and until his death in 1977, Markel continued to work as a freelance writer and consultant and was appointed a Distinguished Visiting Professor at Fairleigh Dickinson University. In his active retirement, Markel wrote "What You Don't Know Can Hurt You," which summarized his philosophy after four decades of experience in the newspaper business. For example, he identified the critical importance of a well-informed public opinion for the survival of democratic government, highlighting the obligation of the newspaper to provide this information to the 20 per cent of the population that is well-informed along with the 40 per cent who "do not know but are willing to learn." Addressing the remaining 40 per cent of the public, he commented that half are "ignorant and unwilling to learn" while the remaining half comprises "the moron category." Markel could also be critical of journalism, sarcastically referring to it as "froth estate," referring to the tendency for entertainment instead of straight news reporting and analysis. Markel clarified three approaches to the news: first, there is the reporting of basic facts; second, there is the interpretation of these facts; and third, there is commentary on the facts. Furthermore, he defined the distinction between interpretation and opinion; interpretation is an objective appraisal, based on background, knowledge of the situation, and analysis of the primary related facts. In contrast, editorial opinion is a subjective judgment, a definite taking of sides. Markel argued that "Opinion must be held, almost religiously, to the editorial page; interpretation is an essential part of the news."

Lester Markel succumbed to cancer at his home at 135 Central Park West, New York, on October 23, 1977; he kept a second home in Oakhurst, New Jersey.

== Quotes from Lester Markel ==
"What you see is news. What you know is background. What you feel is opinion."; "I'm not looking for admiration. All I want is respect."; "Sure I'm a tough editor. I don't believe in Gallup Poll editors who give the reader what they think he wants. I try to please myself."; "I am basically a one- or two-syllable and only occasionally a three-syllable man. I gather that, unless I am predominantly a polysyllabic fellow, I am not fit to print or to be read or even heard."

== Bibliography ==
1. Lester Markel (1949). Public Opinion and Foreign Policy (227 pages). New York, NY: Harper & Bros.
2. Lester Markel (1963). Background and Foreground (495 pages). New York, NY: Dell Publishing Company.
3. Lester Markel (1973). What You Don't Know Can Hurt You: A Study of Public Opinion and Public Emotion (288 pages). New York, NY: Quadrangle/New York Times Book.
4. Lester Markel & Audrey March (1976). Global Challenge to the United States (241 pages). Rutherford, N.J.: Fairleigh Dickinson University Press.
