= John S. Toll =

American particle physicist (1923–2011)

25th President of Washington College
- In office 1995–2004
- Preceded by: Charles H. Trout
- Succeeded by: Baird Tipson

1st Chancellor of the University System of Maryland
- In office 1988–1989
- Preceded by: Himself (as President)
- Succeeded by: Donald N. Langenberg

2nd President of the University of Maryland System
- In office 1978–1988
- Preceded by: Wilson Homer Elkins
- Succeeded by: Himself (as Chancellor)

2nd President of Stony Brook University
- In office 1965–1978
- Preceded by: John Francis Lee
- Succeeded by: John Marburger

Personal details
- Born: October 23, 1923 Denver, Colorado
- Died: July 15, 2011 (aged 87) Bethesda, Maryland
- Scientific career
- Fields: Physics
- Institutions: University of Maryland
- Thesis: The dispersion relation for light and its application to problems involving electron pairs (1952)
- Doctoral advisor: John Archibald Wheeler

John Sampson Toll (October 25, 1923 – July 15, 2011) was an American physicist and educational administrator.

== Education ==
Toll received his bachelor's degree in physics from Yale University in 1944, after which he served in the U.S. Navy in World War II. He finished his Ph.D. in physics at Princeton in 1952 under the supervision of John Archibald Wheeler.

== Career ==
He then moved to the University of Maryland, where he became chair of the Department of Physics and Astronomy in 1953. During his tenure as chair, he was responsible for a major increase in size and quality of the department. The physics building at the University of Maryland is named for him.

In 1965 he left to become the second president of the State University of New York at Stony Brook, a position he held until 1978. While he was there, Stony Brook University, one of four SUNY centers created by then-governor Nelson Rockefeller (briefly Vice President of the United States under Gerald Ford), and, until recently, the only four allowed to call themselves "universities", grew to more than 17,000 students from a handful who started their academic careers before the campus was even finished, at the now-defunct State University of New York on Long Island (SUCOLI).

He then returned to the University of Maryland to become president of the original five campuses of the University of Maryland. Comparable to a chancellor position in other state university systems, at the time Toll oversaw the University of Maryland, College Park, University of Maryland, Baltimore County, University of Maryland University College, University of Maryland, Eastern Shore, and University of Maryland at Baltimore. When Governor William Donald Schaefer decided to merge most of the state's public universities into a single system, Toll was put in charge of the merger. He then became the first chancellor of the new University System of Maryland.

In 1995, at age 71, he became president of Washington College, a small, private liberal arts school in Chestertown, Maryland. There, he was credited with fixing the school's budget crisis and raising its national profile.

As a physicist, Toll was known for his work in dispersion theory and elementary particle physics. Between university jobs in the early 1990s, he was president of the Universities Research Association which oversaw the U.S. Superconducting Supercollider project until Congress defunded it. In January 2004, he announced that he would leave Washington College and return to physics research at the University of Maryland.

== Personal life ==
He married the former Deborah Taintor, and they had two daughters. Toll died on July 15, 2011, of respiratory failure at Fox Hill Assisted Living in Bethesda, Maryland.

Academic offices
Preceded by John Francis Lee	President of Stony Brook University; 1965–1978	Succeeded by John Marburger
Preceded by Wilson Homer Elkins	President of the University of Maryland System; 1978–1988	Office abolished
New office	Chancellor of the University System of Maryland; 1988–1989	Succeeded by Donald N. Langenberg
Preceded by Charles H. Trout	President of the Washington College; 1995–2004	Succeeded by Baird Tipson
