= Hynson–Ringgold House =

Coordinates: 39°12′24.4″N 76°03′53.3″W

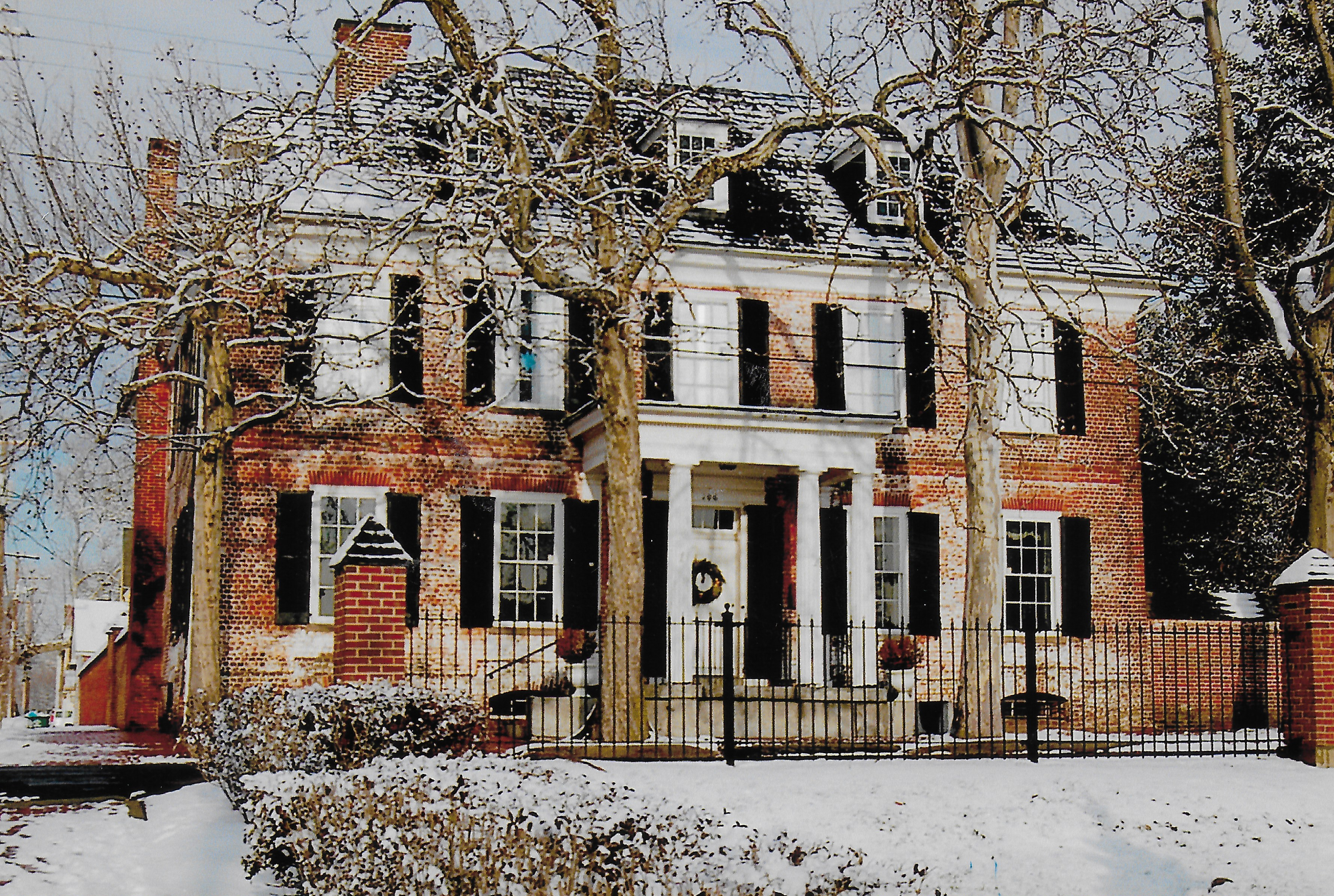
- Interactive map of the Hynson–Ringgold House area
- Alternative names: The Abbey

General information
- Architectural style: Georgian style
- Location: 106 S. Water St, Chestertown, Maryland
- Owner: Washington College

The Hynson–Ringgold House, sometimes known as The Abbey, is the official residence of the president of Washington College. The building is in the Georgian style and is made entirely out of brick. In the rear of the building there is a large enclosed garden. It sits on the corner of Cannon Street and Water Street in Chestertown, Maryland.

== History ==
The lot that the house sits on was purchased by Nathanial Hynson in 1735, but he never built anything on it. Hynson split the lot in two pieces and sold the section near Water Street to William Murphy in 1738. The front of part of the building was then built in 1743. The plan of this original building matches the plan used for the John Dickinson House in Dover, Delaware. In 1759, Murphy purchased the second half of the property. It was then sold to Thomas Ringgold in 1767. Ringgold remodeled the building that Murphy built and tripled its size.

In the 1800s, the property passed through several owners including Richard S. Thomas, James E. Barroll, and, in 1854, James Pearce (who wrote the Pearce Plan that set the boundaries of Texas). Over the next 90 years, the property fell into disrepair. In 1944, the house was purchased by the college for $15,000. It was then restored and turned into the official residence of the President of Washington College.

== Description ==
All of the public areas of the house are in the first floor; the bedrooms are on the second floor. The layout of the rooms on the first floor closely matches those of neighboring Widehall. The wood paneling in the east room was sold to the Baltimore Museum of Art in 1932 and replaced with a replica. In the middle of the house, there is a large hall containing an antler staircase.

Most of the furniture on the first floor is owned by the college, but each president and their family puts their own spin on things. During Douglass Cater's time at the college, all of the public rooms were very formal. but, when Charles Trout was president, the furniture was more relaxed.
