= Wilson Homer Elkins =

American educator and university administrator (1908–1994)

Wilson Elkins
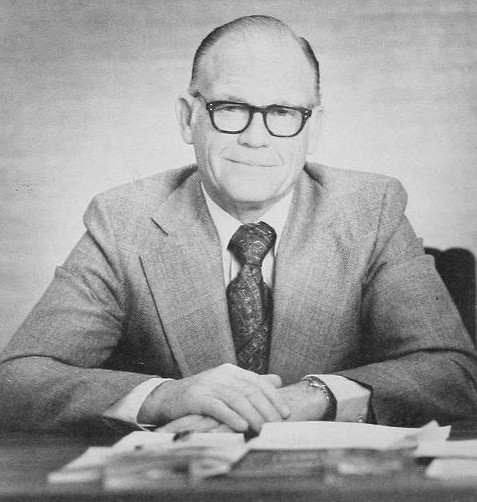

Chancellor of the University of Maryland System
- In office 1970–1978
- Preceded by: Position established
- Succeeded by: John S. Toll

President of the University of Maryland, College Park
- In office 1954–1970
- Preceded by: Thomas B. Symons
- Succeeded by: William English Kirwan

Personal details
- Born: Wilson Homer Elkins; July 9, 1908 Medina, Texas, U.S.
- Died: March 17, 1994 (aged 84) Baltimore, Maryland, U.S.
- Spouse(s): Dorothy Blackburn (1938–1971); Vivian Noh (1972–1994)
- Children: 2
- Education: University of Texas, Austin (BA, MA); Oriel College, Oxford PhD)

Wilson Homer "Bull" Elkins (July 9, 1908 – March 17, 1994) was an American educator and university administrator.

== Career ==
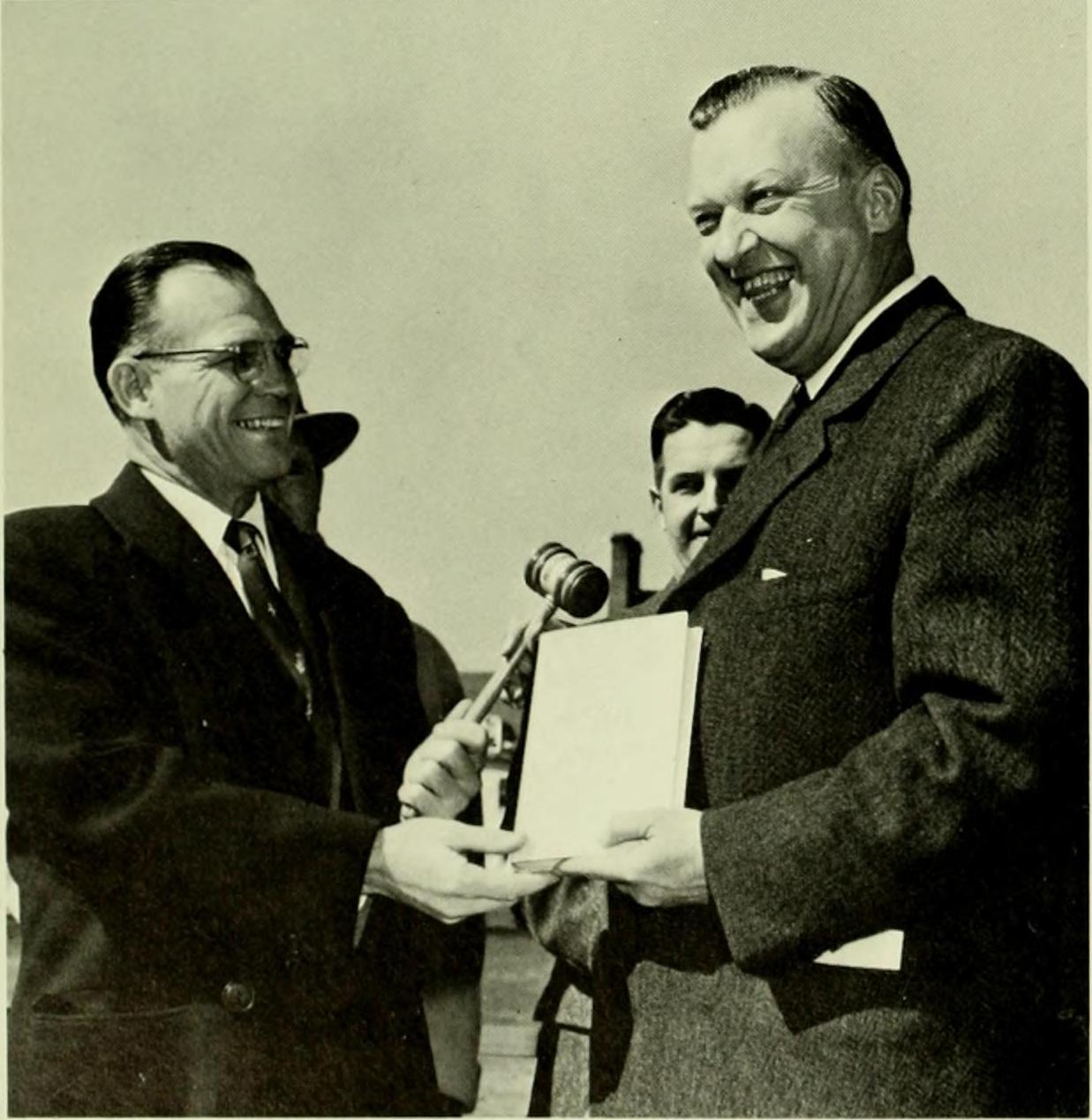
Governor Theodore McKeldin (right) presents Elkins (left) a copy of his book at the opening ceremony of McKeldin Library in 1958.

Elkins served as the president of the University of Maryland from 1954 to 1970, and then was president of the 5 campus University of Maryland System from 1970 to 1978. Elkins received an A.B. and an M.A. from the University of Texas in 1933, where he was also a star college football quarterback. He was a Rhodes Scholar at Oxford University, where he completed a Ph.D. Elkins served as the president of San Angelo Junior College from 1938 to 1948. He left San Angelo to become president of Texas Western College in El Paso until beginning his tenure at the University of Maryland in 1954. At the University of Maryland, Elkins emphasized rigorous academic standards. In 1957, he created the "Academic Probation Plan," threatening 1,550 students—18 percent of the undergraduate enrollment—with expulsion because their grade point averages were lower than a C. University administration sent 14% of students home, but by 1964, 82% of freshmen came from the top half of their high school classes, and Phi Beta Kappa—which had turned down Maryland twice before—had established a chapter on campus.

Elkins supported the establishment of a faculty government and managed a major expansion and improvement of the physical plant, including the construction of the McKeldin Library and the Computer Science Center. Elkins resigned in 1978 at the state's mandatory retirement age of 70. The Elkins Building, constructed in 1979, is located in Adelphi, Maryland and houses the offices of the University System of Maryland Central Administration.

== Personal life ==
Elkins was born on July 9, 1908, in Medina, Texas to Willie and May (Stevens) Elkins. He married Dorothy Blackburn in June 1938, and had two daughters. After Elkins wife's passing in 1971, Elkins married Vivian Noh in 1972. Elkins died in Baltimore in March 1994.
