= Michael J. Sosulski =

American educator (born 1964)

15th President of President of Lake Forest College
- Incumbent
- Assumed office August 11, 2025
- Preceded by: Robert Krebs

President of Washington College
- In office 2021–2025
- Preceded by: Wayne B. Powell
- Succeeded by: Bryan L. Matthews

Personal details
- Born: Michael Joseph Sosulski; 1964 (age 61–62) West Chicago, Illinois, U.S.
- Spouse: Dr. Cori Crane
- Education: Georgetown University (BS); University of Chicago (PhD, MA)

Michael Joseph Sosulski (born 1964) is an American academic and current president of Lake Forest College.

Prior to his role as president of Lake Forest College, Sosulski was president of Washington College from 2021 to 2025, as well as provost and professor of German at Wofford College from 2016 to 2021.

== Early life and education ==
Michael Sosulski was born in Rochester, New York, and raised in West Chicago, Illinois. His parents were both faculty members at the College of DuPage. He graduated from West Chicago Community High School, where he was on Speech Team, Marching Band, German Club, and Thespians. As a high school sophomore he was an exchange student to Germany, and his senior year he won the U.S. Marine Corps Distinguished Youth Music Award. Sosulski then attended Georgetown University, where he majored in German Studies and graduated in 1987. Afterward, he attended the University of Chicago. In 1990, he received his MA in German Studies, and in 1999 he received his PhD in the same field. While completing his PhD he taught German part-time at DePaul University, Valparaiso University, and the University of Chicago.

== Teaching and administrative career ==
Sosulski began his academic career teaching German at Pacific Lutheran University in Tacoma, Washington from 2000 to 2004. He then taught German at Kalamazoo College in Kalamazoo, Michigan from 2004 until 2016. At Kalamazoo he began taking on administrative roles, including Director of Media Studies, Dean of the Sophomore Class, Department Chair of German Studies, and finally as Associate Provost from 2014 to 2016. He then took a position as Provost (Chief Academic Officer) and Professor of German at Wofford College in Spartanburg, South Carolina from 2016 until 2021; during which time he fund-raised $125 million for the college. In 2021, he became president of Washington College in Chestertown, Maryland. In July 2025, it was announced by the Chair of the Board of Trustees, Bill Lowry, that Sosulski had been appointed the fifteenth president of Lake Forest College. He officially assumed office on August 11, 2025, and was formally inaugurated on April 10, 2026. In his second year, the college accepted the largest incoming class since its founding in 1857. Sosulski is an outspoken advocate of liberal arts education.

== Personal life ==
Sosulski resides in Lake Forest, Illinois, with his family. He is married to fellow professor and linguist, Cori Crane, and has two sons. Sosulski is a trained saxophone player.
