= Joseph McLain =

American chemist and college president

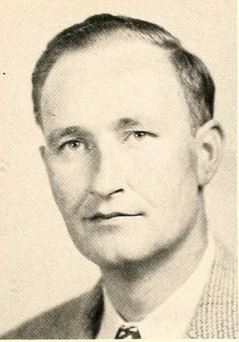
- Joseph McLain in 1951

Academic background
- Education: Johns Hopkins University

Academic work
- Discipline: Chemistry
- Sub-discipline: Pyrotechnics
- Institutions: Washington College

President of Washington College
- In office 1973–1981
- Preceded by: Charles J. Merdinger
- Succeeded by: Garry E. Clarke

Personal details
- Born: July 11, 1916 Weirton, West Virginia, US
- Died: July 26, 1981 (aged 65) Baltimore, Maryland, US
- Spouse: Margret Anne Hollingsworth McLain
- Children: 2

Joseph Howard McLain (July 11, 1916 – July 26, 1981) was an American chemist. He was a professor at Washington College and became college president. He is best known for his expertise in solid state chemistry and pyrotechnics. He held 30 patents, including for smoke grenades, underwater torches, and flares.

== Biography ==
Joseph McLain was born in Weirton, West Virginia on July 11, 1916, the son of Howard and Elizabeth McLain. He spent his childhood in Baltimore, Maryland. Like his older brother, McLain was educated at Washington College. While in college, McLain was a member of Theta Chi, president of the class of 1937, and played basketball, football, lacrosse, and track. He did his doctoral work at Johns Hopkins University in chemistry. During World War II, McLain paused his education to serve as a major in the US Army Chemical Corps doing research on smoke screens and pyrotechnics.

Joseph McLain received his doctorate in 1946 and joined the faculty of Washington College the same year. While he was a professor, McLain was a partner in the Kent Manufacturing Company, which made fireworks, until there was an explosion at the plant in 1954. During the explosion, McLain rescued two women from the plant. After the disaster, McLain and his partners dissolved the company and McLain and worked on safety standards for fireworks with fellow Washington College alumnus and professor John Conkling. The pair wrote recommendations for the safe storage for fireworks that became part of the first US standards. In addition to his pyrotechnic research, McLain was active in environmental work, serving as a trustee of the Chesapeake Bay Foundation and sitting on Maryland Water Pollution Control Commission. In 1973, McLain became the president of Washington College. He is the only alumnus of the school to ever serve as president. McLain took a leave of absence from the college in 1981 and died in Baltimore at Johns Hopkins Hospital the same year.

== Personal life ==
Joseph McLain was married to Margret Ann Hollingsworth McLain.

== Publications ==
- McLain, Joseph Howard (1980). Pyrotechnics: From the Viewpoint of Solid State Chemistry. Philadelphia: Franklin Institute Press. ISBN 9780891680321.
