= Donald N. Langenberg =

American physicist and university chancellor (1932–2019)

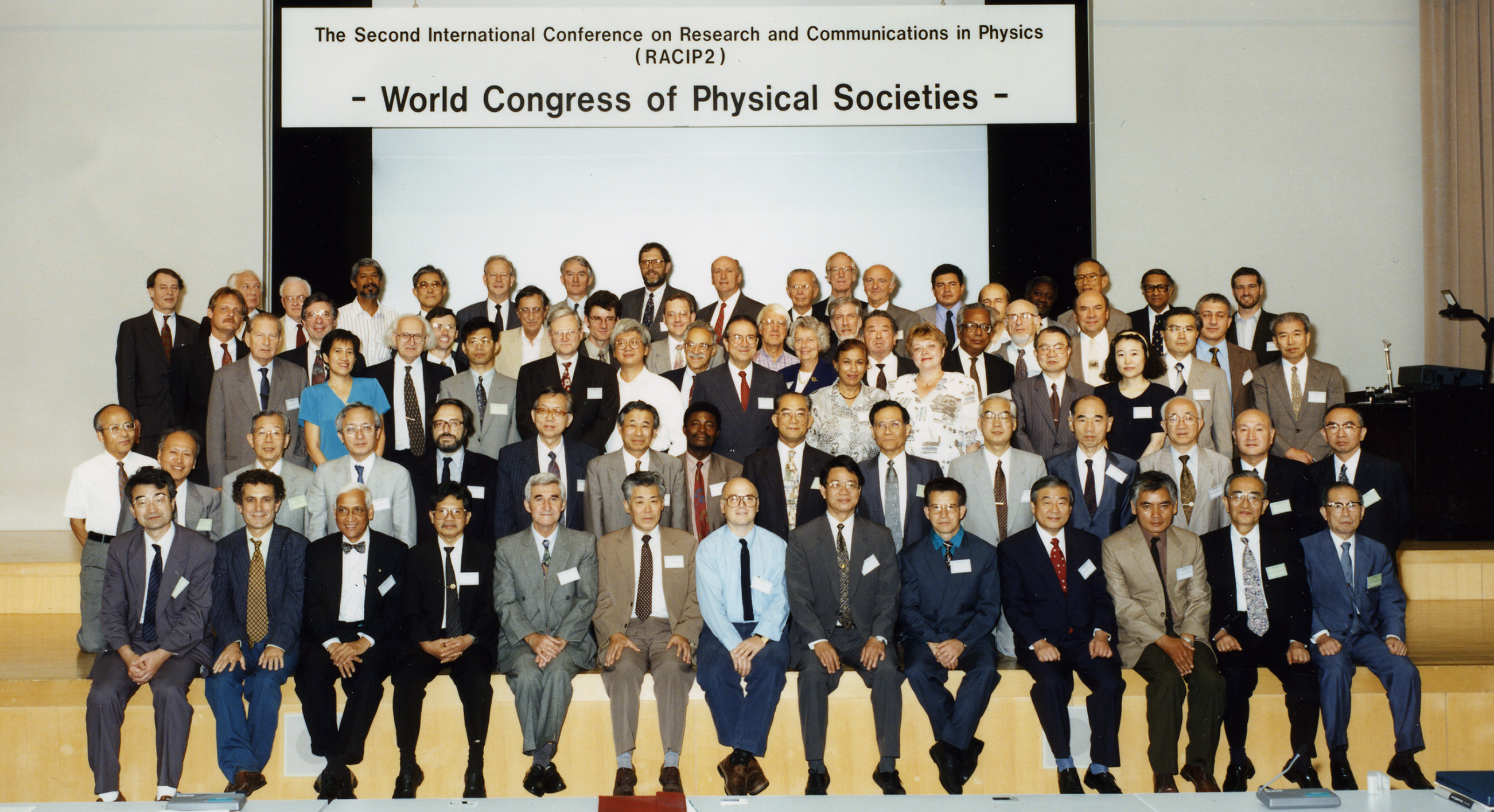
- Langenberg at the Second International Conference on Research and Communications in Physics

2nd Chancellor of University System of Maryland
- In office 1990 – August 1, 2002
- Preceded by: John S. Toll
- Succeeded by: William Kirwan

1st Chancellor of University of Illinois at Chicago
- In office 1983–1990
- Succeeded by: James J. Stukel

Personal details
- Born: Donald Newton Langenberg; March 17, 1932 Devils Lake, North Dakota, U.S.
- Died: January 25, 2019 (aged 86) Baltimore, Maryland, U.S.
- Spouse: Patricia Langenberg
- Education: Iowa State University; University of California, Los Angeles; University of California, Berkeley (Ph.D.)
- Occupation: Physicist; Professor
- Awards: John Price Wetherill Medal (1975)
- Scientific career
- Fields: Physics
- Institutions: University of Pennsylvania; University of Illinois at Chicago; University of Maryland, College Park
- Thesis: Cyclotron resonance in metals (1959)
- Doctoral advisor: Arthur F. Kip
- Doctoral students: William H. Parker

Donald Newton Langenberg (March 17, 1932 – January 25, 2019) was an American physicist, academic, and university administrator. He served as chancellor of the University System of Maryland from 1990 until 2002 and was the first chancellor of the University of Illinois at Chicago. Langenberg taught at the University of Oxford, the École Normale Supérieure, the California Institute of Technology, and the Technical University of Munich and served on the board of trustees at the University of the District of Columbia and the University of Pennsylvania.

Langenberg earned his bachelor's degree from Iowa State University, master's degree from the University of California, Los Angeles and Ph.D. from the University of California, Berkeley. He also received honorary degrees from the University of Pennsylvania and the State University of New York. In 1980, he was named deputy director of the National Science Foundation by Jimmy Carter. Among the awards he received are the John Price Wetherill Medal of the Franklin Institute and the Distinguished Contribution to Research Administration Award of the Society of Research Administrators. As a physicist, Langenberg was an expert in the area of superconductivity.

Langenberg died in January 2019, at the age of 86, at his home in the Dickeyville Historic District of Baltimore.

Academic offices
Preceded by John S. Toll	Chancellor of the University System of Maryland; 1990– 2002	Succeeded by William Kirwan
