= Richard N. Haass =

American diplomat (born 1951)

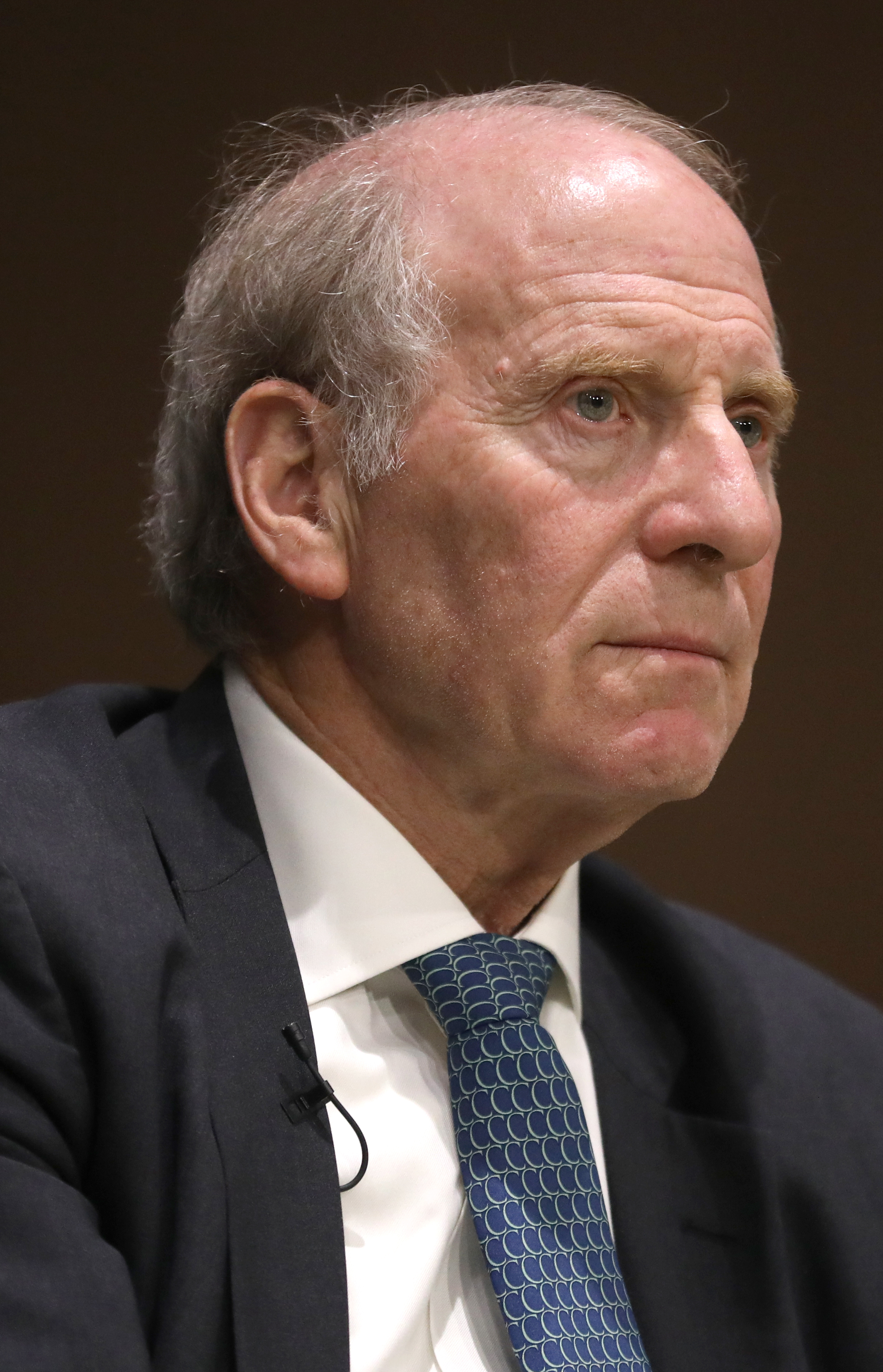
- Haass in 2023

President of the Council on Foreign Relations
- In office July 16, 2003 – June 30, 2023
- Preceded by: Leslie H. Gelb
- Succeeded by: Michael Froman

United States Special Envoy for Northern Ireland
- In office February 6, 2001 – July 12, 2003
- President: George W. Bush
- Preceded by: George Mitchell
- Succeeded by: Mitchell Reiss

21st Director of Policy Planning
- In office February 6, 2001 – July 12, 2003
- President: George W. Bush
- Preceded by: Morton Halperin
- Succeeded by: Mitchell Reiss

Personal details
- Born: Richard Nathan Haass; July 28, 1951 (age 75) Brooklyn, New York, U.S.
- Party: Republican (Before 2020); Independent (2020–present)
- Spouse: Susan Mercandetti (1990–present)
- Children: 2
- Education: Oberlin College (BA); Wadham College, Oxford (MPhil); St Antony's College, Oxford (DPhil)
- Awards: Presidential Citizens Medal; Secretary's Distinguished Service Award; Tipperary International Peace Award; Gold and Silver Star of the Order of the Rising Sun

Richard Nathan Haass (born July 28, 1951) is an American diplomat. He was president of the Council on Foreign Relations from July 2003 to June 2023, prior to which he was director of policy planning for the United States Department of State and a close advisor to Secretary of State Colin Powell in the George W. Bush administration. In October 2022, Haass announced he would be departing from his position at CFR in June 2023. He was succeeded by former U.S. trade representative Michael Froman.

The Senate approved Haass as a candidate for the position of ambassador and he has been U.S. coordinator for the future of Afghanistan. He succeeded George J. Mitchell as the United States special envoy for Northern Ireland to help the peace process in Northern Ireland, for which he received the State Department's Distinguished Service Award.

At the end of 2003, Mitchell Reiss succeeded him as special envoy. In late 2013, Haass returned to Northern Ireland to chair inter-party talks aimed at addressing some of the unresolved issues from the peace process such as parades, flags, and "the past" (now known as "the Troubles").

== Early life and education ==
Haass was born to a Jewish family in Brooklyn, the son of Marcella (née Rosenthal) and Irving B. Haass. Haass graduated from Roslyn High School in 1969. His father was a securities analyst and partner at investment management firm David J. Greene & Co. He completed a bachelor's degree at Oberlin College in 1973, and was a Rhodes scholar at Oxford University, where he completed a master's degree and doctoral degree in 1978.

== Career ==
Haass served at the Department of Defense from 1979 to 1980, and at the Department of State from 1981 to 1985. From 1989 to 1993, he was special assistant to President George H. W. Bush and National Security Council senior director for Near East and South Asian Affairs. In 1991, Haass received the Presidential Citizens Medal for helping to develop and explain U.S. policy during Operation Desert Shield and Operation Desert Storm.

Richard Haass worked for Secretary of State Colin Powell in the Bush administration and was director of policy planning at the State Department from 2001 to 2003 during the lead-up to the Iraq War. Haass has said he was 60 percent against the Iraq War.

Haass's other postings include vice president and director of foreign policy studies at the Brookings Institution, the Sol M. Linowitz Visiting Professor of International Studies at Hamilton College, a senior associate at the Carnegie Endowment for International Peace, a lecturer in public policy at Harvard University's Kennedy School of Government, and a research associate at the International Institute for Strategic Studies.

Throughout the 2008 presidential campaign, Haass advised several members of both the Republican Party and Democratic Party on issues regarding foreign policy, but did not publicly endorse a candidate due to the Council on Foreign Relations' non-partisan stance.

In September 2013, Haass returned to Northern Ireland, with Professor Meghan O'Sullivan, to chair all party talks on flags, parades and the legacy of The Troubles, after violence flared over the removal of the union flag at Belfast City Hall. The talks broke down on December 31, 2013.

Haass joined the investment banking firm Centerview Partners as a senior counselor in 2023. He is a member of the Inter-American Dialogue.

== Foreign policy views ==
In a May 2015 interview with BBC's HARDtalk, speaking as President of the Council on Foreign Relations, Haass predicted a new era in world history, in part due to the muting of U.S. dominance by the more diffuse power wielded by states and non-state entities as a result of the proliferation of nuclear arms and cyberterrorism, and several policy failures, which may bring about an "era of disorder" in the absence of any clear superpower.

On October 4, 2017, Haass called for U.S. Secretary of State Rex Tillerson to resign.

In December 2021, Haass criticized the Biden administration's withdrawal from Afghanistan as “America-first unilateralism in practice," indicating that Biden “did so in a Trumpian way, consulting minimally with others and leaving NATO allies to scramble.”

In April 2023, former U.S. officials including Richard Haass, Charles Kupchan, Thomas Graham, and Mary Beth Long, among others, were reported to have conducted unofficial meetings with Russian foreign minister Sergey Lavrov. In an extensive article published by the Council on Foreign Relations' Foreign Affairs, Haass and Kupchan detailed what they termed as a "a plan for getting from the battlefield to the negotiating table." These interactions were allegedly centered on adjusting U.S. policy with the intent of facilitating Russia's acquisition of Ukrainian territory, an action that is purportedly in violation of U.S. law. The engagement of former U.S. officials in informal dialogues with Russians has led to a schism among American diplomats, foreign policy academics, and national security experts. Michael McFaul, former U.S. ambassador to Russia under President Obama, voiced concern that conversations about potential resolutions without involvement of Ukrainian representatives, could undermine the stance of the Biden administration insisting that Ukraine's future cannot be decided in backrooms: “If you’re having Track Two negotiations about how to end the war, Ukrainians have to be there,” said McFaul.

== Personal life ==
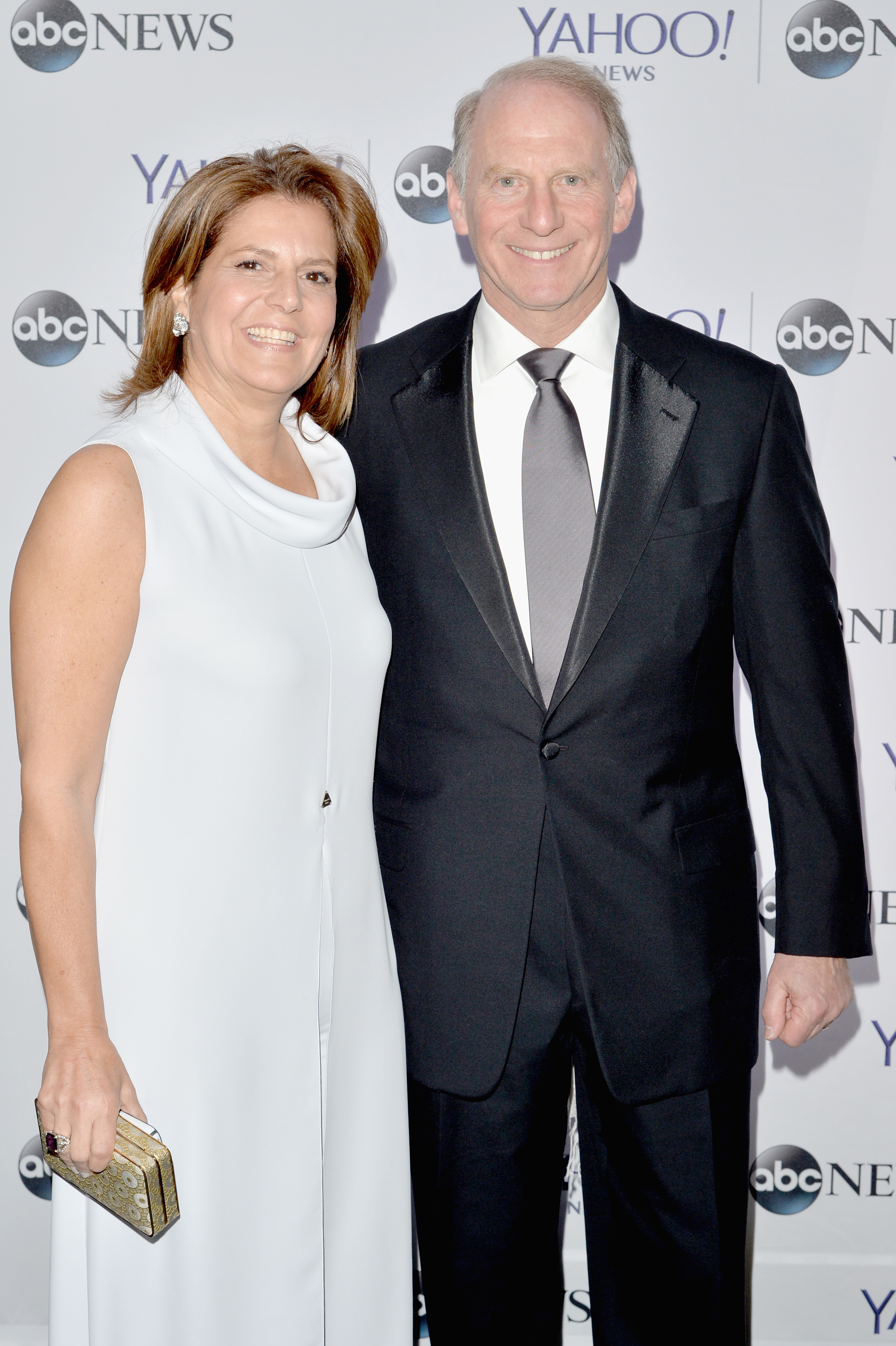
Haass with his wife Susan Mercandetti in May 2014

Haass lives in New York City with his wife, Susan Mercandetti; they have two children.

According to Axios, Haass is a member of Dialog, a secret society founded by Peter Thiel and Auren Hoffman.

== Books ==
Haass is the author or editor of thirteen books on American foreign policy and one book on management.

Books authored:

- The Bill of Obligations: The Ten Habits of Good Citizens. New York: Penguin Press. 2023. ISBN 9780525560654. OCLC 1340645618.
- The World: A Brief Introduction. Penguin Press, 2020. ISBN 978-0399562396.
- A World in Disarray: American Foreign Policy and the Crisis of the Old Order. Penguin Press, 2017. ISBN 978-0399562365.
- Foreign Policy Begins at Home: The Case for Putting America's House in Order. Basic Books, 2014. ISBN 978-0465071999.
- War of Necessity, War of Choice: A Memoir of Two Iraq Wars. Simon & Schuster, 2010. ISBN 978-1416549031.
- Co-authored with Martin Indyk (2008). Restoring the Balance: A Middle East Strategy for the Next President. Brookings Institution Press. ISBN 978-0815738695.
- The Opportunity. PublicAffairs, 2006. ISBN 978-1586484538.
- Intervention: The Use of American Military Force in the Post-Cold War World. Carnegie Endowment for International Peace, 1999. ISBN 978-0870031359.
- The Bureaucratic Entrepreneur: How to Be Effective in Any Unruly Organization. Brookings Institution Press, 1999. ISBN 978-0815733539.
- Economic Sanctions and American Diplomacy. Council on Foreign Relations Press, 1998. ISBN 978-0876092125.
- The Reluctant Sheriff: The United States After the Cold War. Council on Foreign Relations Press, 1997. ISBN 978-0876091982.
- The Power to Persuade. Houghton Mifflin, 1994. ISBN 978-0395675854.
- Conflicts Unending: The United States and Regional Disputes. Yale University Press, 1990. ISBN 978-0300045550.

Books edited

- Transatlantic Tensions: The United States, Europe, and Problem Countries. Brookings Institution Press, 1999. ISBN 978-0815733522.
- Superpower Arms Control: Setting the Record Straight, edited with Albert Carnesale. Ballinger Publishing Company, 1987. ISBN 978-0887302282.

Book contributions

- "War Can Be Justified When It Is the Best Policy Option". War. Detroit: Greenhaven Press, 2014, pp. 22–26. ISBN 978-0737769715.

== Filmography ==
Haass has appeared as himself on dozens of TV shows and documentaries since 1996. He has served as consultant on NBC News and hosted the online international affairs forum of the New York Times.

Following the publication of A World in Disarray in 2017, the book was adapted into a feature-length documentary by VICE for release the same year on July 21. (Note: The full-length documentary film VICE Special Report: A World in Disarray is available for viewing on the official Council on Foreign Relations website via YouTube.) Through interviews with Haass and other policymakers academics associated with the council, the film explores the themes and concepts laid out in the book: the disorder in today's international landscape, how it arose, and how it plays out in Syria, Ukraine, the South China Sea, and North Korea. In addition to providing commentary throughout the film, Haass served as a consulting producer.

== Explanatory notes ==
Political offices
Preceded by Morton Halperin	Director of Policy Planning; 2001–2003	Succeeded by Mitchell Reiss
Diplomatic posts
Preceded by George J. Mitchell	United States Special Envoy for Northern Ireland; 2001–2003	Succeeded by Mitchell Reiss
