= William James Rivers =

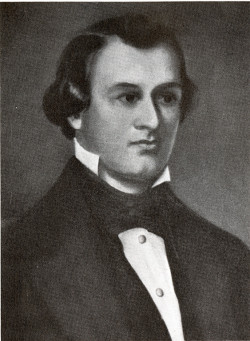
- Willam J. River's Portrait by an unknown artist

Academic background
- Education: University of South Carolina

Academic work
- Discipline: History and Greek Literature
- Institutions: University of South Carolina; Washington College

President of Washington College
- In office 1873–1889
- Preceded by: Robert C. Berkeley
- Succeeded by: Charles Wesley Reid

Personal details
- Born: July 17, 1822 Charleston, South Carolina
- Died: June 22, 1909 (aged 86) Baltimore, Maryland

William James Rivers (July 17, 1822 - June 22, 1909) was an American Historian and Academic. His works were published before, during, and after the American Civil War, with some of his works, such as his novel "Eunice: A Tale of Reconstruction Times in South Carolina", have been republished in the 21st Century. Outside of writing, Rivers was a professor of Greek Literature at the University of South Carolina between 1856 and 1873, which ended when he was invited to become the principal of Washington College.

== Childhood and family background ==
Rivers was born 17 July 1822 in Charleston, South Carolina. His father, John David Rivers, was an English immigrant who had kept a residence on Queen Street until he was ruined when a friend, for whom he had signed as surety on a loan, defaulted. John David Rivers lost his all, his house on Queen Street, and his life within the year, dying 29 December 1831. His widow, Eliza Ridgewood (Ms. McKinney mistakenly spells it as Richwood) Rivers placed her two sons—William James and David Selvester—in the Charleston Orphan House. She moved into that facility a year later, serving as a nurse there until her own death in 1843. William James Rivers's brother, David Selvester Rivers, volunteered and served in the Confederate army as a sergeant. William James Rivers, who had begun his education as a scholarship student at the Grammar School of the College of Charleston and had become a full professor by the time of the American Civil War, was exempted from military service, due to his profession.

== Early career ==
Rivers's "Sketch of the History of South Carolina to the Close of the Proprietary Government by the Revolution of 1719", published in 1856, cemented his position in the Charleston literary world. Additionally, Rivers founded an Academy for Boys on Cooper Street, the building of which still stands and forms a portion of a guided tour of Charleston, in which ancient languages were emphasised, and which attracted the sons of Charleston's elite. By 1850 professors at South Carolina College recommended Rivers's preparatory school for boys as "one of the best in the State"(Robert Rogers to Rivers, December 19, 1850, Rivers Papers, SCL.) One of the three founders of the South Carolina Historical Society, W. J. Rivers produced many historical pieces and poetry to Russell's Magazine, a prestigious Southern literary journal published in Charleston, between 1858 and 1859. The wealthiest planter in Charleston was a Mr. Dimrud from Prussia, who sent his grandson Henry Timrod—the surname was anglicised from Dimrud—to Rivers's academy, and Henry Timrod eventually became poet laureate of the Confederacy. Thereafter, Rivers accepted the position of professor emeritus of Ancient Languages at South Carolina College, which was later to evolve into the University of South Carolina. Rivers was an eyewitness to the Burning of Columbia by Sherman's army, and this provided the background for his novel "Eunice: A Tale of Reconstruction Times in South Carolina". The novel is very closely based on fact, and opens with the burning of the capital 17 February 1865.

== Later career ==
When South Carolina College reorganised as the University of South Carolina in 1865, Rivers returned to the faculty as professor of ancient languages and literature. His former pupil and friend, Henry Timrod, poet laureate of the Confederacy, once the wealthiest citizen of Charleston, had died a pauper (even being predeceased by his little son) and there were no funds to erect a memorial over the poet's grave. Rivers gave a lecture on Timrod's poetry which he published in 1876 as "A Little Book" to obtain means for placing a memorial stone upon the grave of the poet Henry Timrod. In it was the beginning of a poem called 'Eldred' which Rivers would later (1904) turn into a novel in verse. When the University of South Carolina began enrolling African Americans in 1873, Rivers resigned his position and accepted the presidency of Washington College in Chestertown, Maryland. He was president of Washington College for fourteen years, and retired to 23 Calvert Street in Baltimore, where he died on 22 June 1909. Students, faculty, and alumni met the train in Columbia bearing his body, and attended his burial in Elmwood Cemetery.

== Other writings ==
Other writings of William James Rivers include, "College Addresses, Et Cetera". His "Historical Sketch" was long regarded as the definitive work on South Carolina history, and was famous among historiographers for the thitherto unprecedented scale of its use of unpublished sources. Rivers also continued to contribute to the alumnae bulletin as late as 1903, when he revealed that he had once declined the post of Treasurer of the Confederate States in Richmond due to his inability to pay the bond himself. Despite a rich friend having offered to put up the bond for him, Rivers refused, citing what had happened to his father when he had stood surety for another. Christopher Memminger did accept the post which Rivers had refused. Also the South Caroliniana Library contains many unpublished volumes. Rivers took a lead role in the founding of the South Carolina Historical Society in 1855, a project which associated him with lowcountry luminaries James L. Petigru, William Gilmore Simms, and Frederick A. Porcher.

== Legacy ==
Having been published as recently as 2006 by the University of South Carolina and his unpublished manuscripts forming an important part of the permanent manuscript collection of USC. Tara Courtney McKinney, editor of the 2006 republication of "Eunice", has done a great deal of biographical research as well.
