= Madison College (Pennsylvania) =

Methodist college in Uniontown, Pennsylvania, US (1827–1857)

Madison College was an educational institution in Uniontown, Pennsylvania, operated by the Methodist Episcopal Church. The college was chartered by the Pennsylvania legislature in 1827, and it was operated by the Methodist Episcopal Church until 1832, after which it became associated with the Cumberland Presbyterian Church. Andrew Stewart was instrumental in its physical construction.

Henry Bidleman Bascom was the first president, 1827–29, and Charles Elliott (languages) and John H. Fielding (mathematics) were the first professors. After Bascom left, Fielding then served as president between 1829 and 1831, and John Clark took over Fielding's math professorship. Among the students of the late 1820s were William Hunter and Rice G. Hopwood. Waitman T. Willey was the first graduate of the college, and the second graduating class contained six students: James H. McMechen, Alfred Sturgis, James A. Van Dyke, Philip Ross, Samuel Austin, and William Austin. Bishop Matthew Simpson, who gave the funeral speech at Abraham Lincoln's funeral, was an alumnus. Thomas Brownfield Searight, William H. Barclay, and James F. Dayton also attended the college, and Wilton B. Goff was a professor of mathematics and natural science.

Richard H. Ball was inaugurated as president of Madison College on Sept. 1, 1851, at which time the college was under the auspices of the Methodist Protestant Church. Faculty members during the 1850s included J.F. Crocker (mathematics), W.J.T. Carroll (languages), J. Dawson (chemistry), J.B. Howell (law), Augustus Mot (modern languages), and G.B. McElroy (preparatory department). Francis Waters was selected as president in summer 1853 but left later that fall because of family illness; Samuel K. Cox became the interim president and then was named president in summer 1854. For the fall 1855 session, George Brown was president of the college, and the faculty consisted of P.S. Bancroft (mathematics and science), M.B. Goff (languages), and George B. McElroy (English and preparatory department). The college's final session occurred in fall 1857, with George Brown serving as president and John Deford (an alumnus of the college), William Campbell, and Amos Hutton serving as faculty for the several dozen students enrolled. The growing division between north and south over the issue of slavery, plus the establishment of some additional religiously affiliated colleges in the southern states that attracted southern money and students, contributed significantly to the demise of Madison College.

The facility was used as a school for orphans of soldiers after the Civil War. In the late 1880s the buildings were used by the Gilbert Collegiate Institute, which was run by C.A. Gilbert.
