= Mitchell Reiss =

American diplomat (born 1957)

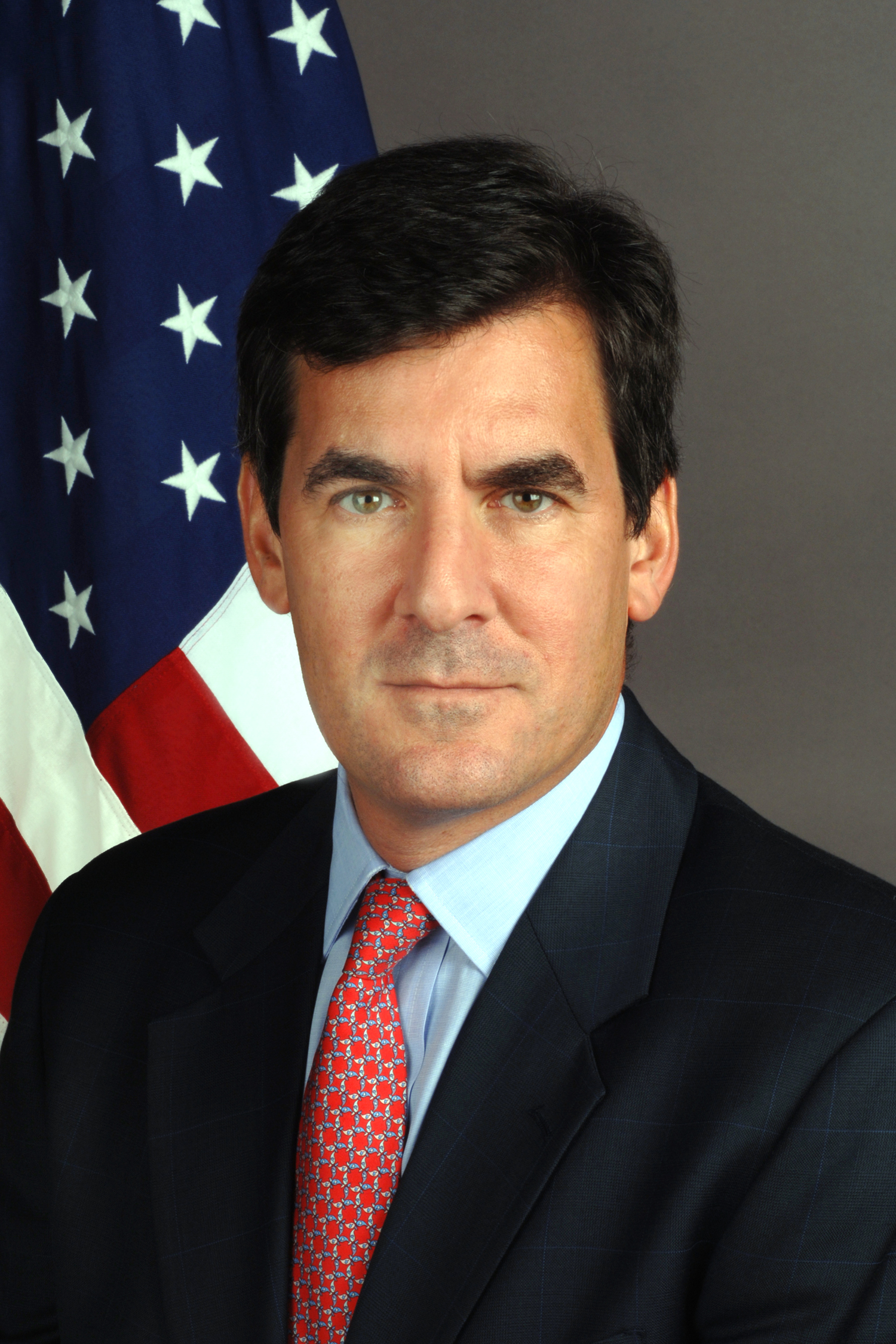

27th President of Washington College
- In office July 2010 – July 2014
- Preceded by: Baird Tipson
- Succeeded by: Jack S. Griswold

United States Special Envoy for Northern Ireland
- In office August 27, 2003 – January 11, 2007
- President: George W. Bush
- Preceded by: Richard Haass
- Succeeded by: Paula Dobriansky

22nd Director of Policy Planning
- In office August 27, 2003 – January 20, 2005
- President: George W. Bush
- Preceded by: Richard N. Haass
- Succeeded by: Stephen D. Krasner

Personal details
- Party: Republican
- Education: Williams College (BA); Tufts University (MA); Columbia University (JD); St Antony's College, Oxford (PhD)

Mitchell B. Reiss is an American diplomat, academic, and business leader who served as the 8th President and CEO of The Colonial Williamsburg Foundation, the 27th president of Washington College and in the United States Department of State.

== Education ==
Reiss earned a Bachelor of Arts degree from Williams College, a Master of Arts from the Fletcher School of Law and Diplomacy at Tufts University, a Juris Doctor from Columbia Law School, and a D.Phil. from St Antony's College, Oxford.

== Career ==
=== Diplomacy ===
Reiss served as Director of Policy Planning at the United States Department of State from 2003 to 2005. He also concurrently served as the United States Special Envoy for Northern Ireland, with the title of Ambassador, from 2003 to 2007. He was also selected to be a White House Fellow and was assigned to the National Security Council, where he worked both as Special Assistant for Brent Scowcroft and Colin Powell.

As a Special Envoy to Northern Ireland, he worked closely with the British and Irish governments to persuade the political parties representing Northern Ireland's two “traditions” to finally end the “Troubles” and restore local government. Reiss was instrumental in the denying of Gerry Adams a visa to the United States, to spur the endorsement of policing and justice in Northern Ireland by Adams and his political party, Sinn Féin.

From 1995 to 1999, he was Chief Negotiator in the Korean Peninsula Energy Development Organization, an organization established by the United States, South Korea, and Japan to implement the Agreed Framework on preventing nuclear proliferation on the Korean peninsula. He has served on the National Security Council, the Council on Foreign Relations, the State Department, Lawrence Livermore National Laboratory and has consulted for Los Alamos National Laboratory. Previously, he was Vice-Provost for International Affairs, Professor of Law at the William and Mary Law School, and Professor of Government in the Department of Government at the College of William and Mary.

In 2016, the UK Government appointed Reiss as its representative to the four-person International Reporting Commission to help end paramilitary activities in Northern Ireland.

=== Career ===
Reiss practiced general corporate and banking law at Covington & Burling from 1989 to 1992.

Reiss also served as a national security advisor to then-Governor Mitt Romney during his 2008 and 2012 presidential campaigns, but was eventually demoted for having supported the MEK.

Reiss was the 27th President of Washington College from 2010 to 2014, where he internationalized the student body, raised SAT scores and lowered the discount rate, created an innovative three-year pathway to graduation to reduce student and family debt, and balanced the budget for four straight years.

Reiss was the 8th President and CEO of The Colonial Williamsburg Foundation, America's largest living history museum, from October 2014 until October 2019, where he focused on restoring the institution's financial health and fulfilling its educational mission. Reiss managed $1.1 billion of assets, led 2,000 employees and 1,000 volunteers, and stewarded over 100,000 donors. Reiss defunded research and interpreter training and introduced less traditional activities, such as an escape room and a "Halloween zombie pirate adventure". He generated profitable commercial operations for the first time in Foundation history, achieved four straight years of record fund-raising, won reaccreditation from the American Alliance of Museums, and recruited and retained the most diverse leadership team in Foundation history.

Since moving to the UK in late 2023, Reiss has consulted for two English Football League teams: Wrexham, providing a strategic plan for Ryan Reynolds and Rob McElhenny, and in the sale of Colchester United. He has also served as Chairman of the International Churchill Society and of the Imperial War Museum Foundation. He is a Distinguished Fellow at the Royal United Services Institute, where he helps lead a project on transatlantic relations.

== Personal life ==
Mitchell is married to Elisabeth Reiss. They have two children.

== Books ==
- Negotiating with Evil: When to Talk to Terrorists, ASIN B003MZ14OQ (New York: Open Road Integrated Media, 2010).
- Bridled Ambition: Why Countries Constrain Their Nuclear Capabilities, ISBN 0-943875-71-4 (Washington, D.C.: Woodrow Wilson Center Press/Johns Hopkins University Press, 1995).
- Without the Bomb: The Politics of Nuclear Non-proliferation, ISBN 0-231-06439-X (New York: Columbia University Press, 1988).
- THE NUCLEAR TIPPING POINT: WHY STATES RECONSIDER THEIR NUCLEAR CHOICES, ISBN 81-7049-227-0 (co-editor with Kurt M. Campbell and Robert J. Einhorn), (Washington, D.C.: Brookings Institution Press, 2004).
- Nuclear Proliferation after the Cold War (co-editor/author with Robert S. Litwak), ISBN 0-943875-64-1 (Washington, D.C.: Johns Hopkins University Press, 1994).
- THE PRESIDENTS: 250 YEARS OF AMERICAN POLITICAL LEADERSHIP, (chapter on “George Washington,” in Iain Dale, ed.) (London: Hodder and Stoughton, 2021).

== Recent Congressional Testimony ==
- “Reaffirming the Good Friday Agreement”, testimony before the Subcommittee on Europe, Energy, the Environment and Cyber of the House Committee on Foreign Affairs, May 5, 2021.

== Select Recent Articles ==
- “Managing Corporate Culture Now Means Managing Great Expectations”, with Daniel Forrester, HUNTSCANLON MEDIA, November 10, 2021, https://huntscanlon.com/managing-corporate-culture-now-means-managing-great-expectations/
- “America as Geopolitical Risk”, AMERICAN PURPOSE, October 27, 2021, https://www.americanpurpose.com/articles/america-as-geopolitical-risk/.
- “Global Britain in a competitive age: The Integrated Review of Security, Defense, Development and Foreign Policy”, SURVIVAL, A Review Essay, Vol. 63 (3), May 25, 2021, https://www.tandfonline.com/doi/full/10.1080/00396338.2021.1930415
- “The Republican Party and U.S Foreign Policy: What Next?”, RUSI, March 17, 2021. https://rusieurope.eu/commentary/republican-party-and-us-foreign-policy-what-next?page=4
- “Bash Beijing or Play Nice?”, AMERICAN PURPOSE, December 9, 2020, https://www.americanpurpose.com/articles/bash-beijing-or-play-nice/.
- “The Global Stakes on Why Black Lives Matter,”, with Claudia Coscia, THE WILSON CENTER, September 21, 2020, https://www.wilsoncenter.org/article/global-stakes-why-black-lives-matter.
- “Our China Problem,”, THE AMERICAN INTEREST, April 28, 2020, https://www.the-american-interest.com/2020/04/28/our-china-problem/.
- “After Black Lives Matter, Now Comes the Hard Part,”, THE CEO FORUM, Fall 2020, pp. 84–85, https://theceoforumgroup.com/wp-content/uploads/2020/11/ceo.forum_.leadership.fullissue.v3.pdf
- “Managing the Higher Ed Obstacle Course,”, INSIDE HIGHER ED, June 11, 2020, https://www.insidehighered.com/views/2020/06/11/when-colleges-reopen-they-should-prioritize-bringing-back-graduate-students-opinion.

Diplomatic posts
Preceded by Richard Haass	United States Special Envoy for Northern Ireland; 2001–2003	Succeeded by Paula Dobriansky
