= Mark Erickson =

Mark Erickson may refer to:

- Mark Erickson, member of the band Fog (band)
- Mark H. Erickson, president of Wittenberg University, 2005–2012
