= William Smith (Episcopal priest) =

Scottish-American Episcopal priest and college administrator (1727-1803)

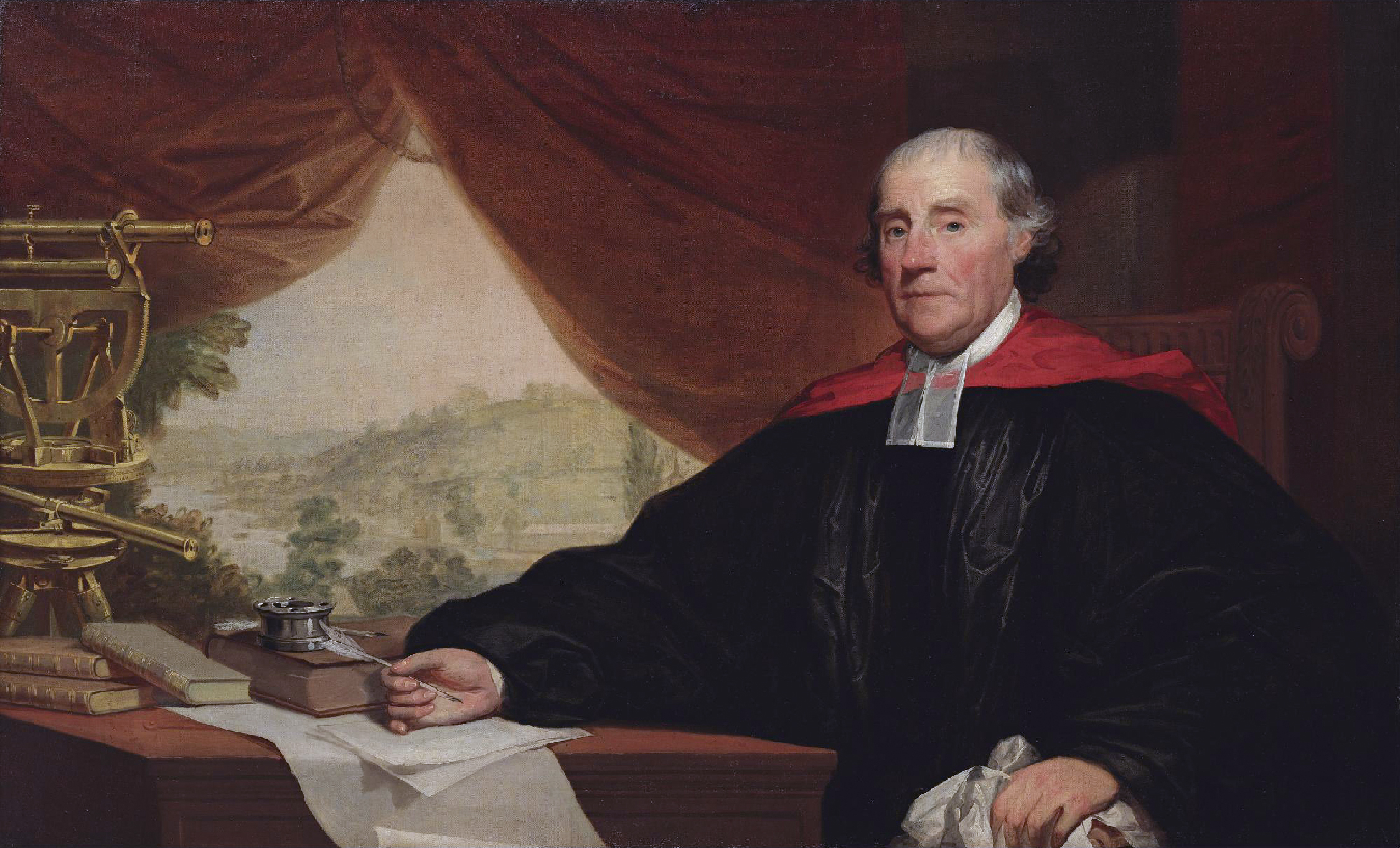
- Portrait of William Smith by Gilbert Stuart
- Born: September 7, 1727; Aberdeen, Scotland
- Died: May 11, 1803 (aged 75); Philadelphia, Pennsylvania, U.S.
- Resting place: Laurel Hill Cemetery, Philadelphia, Pennsylvania, U.S.
- Education: University of Aberdeen
- Occupations: Episcopal priest, provost of The Academy and College of Philadelphia, Founder of Washington College and St. John's College

William Smith (September 7, 1727 – May 14, 1803) was a Scottish-American Episcopal priest who served as first provost of the College of Philadelphia, which became the University of Pennsylvania. He also founded Washington College in Chestertown, Maryland, and St. John's College in Annapolis, Maryland. He later founded the borough of Huntingdon, Pennsylvania, where he was a significant land owner.

== Early life and education ==
Coat of Arms of William Smith

Dr. Smith as a young man

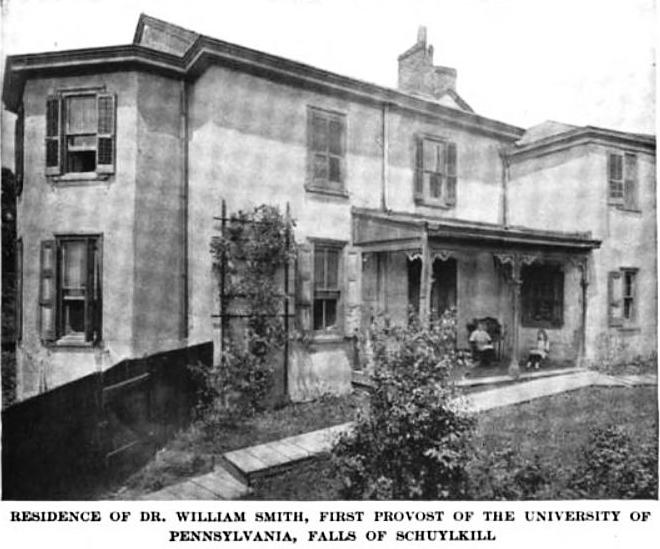
William Smith's residence as it appeared circa 1919

Smith was born September 7, 1727 in Aberdeen, Scotland, to Thomas and Elizabeth (Duncan) Smith. He attended the University of Aberdeen but left in 1747 before receiving his degree. He received a degree of Doctor of Divinity from Aberdeen, the University of Oxford, and Trinity College, Dublin.

== Personal life ==
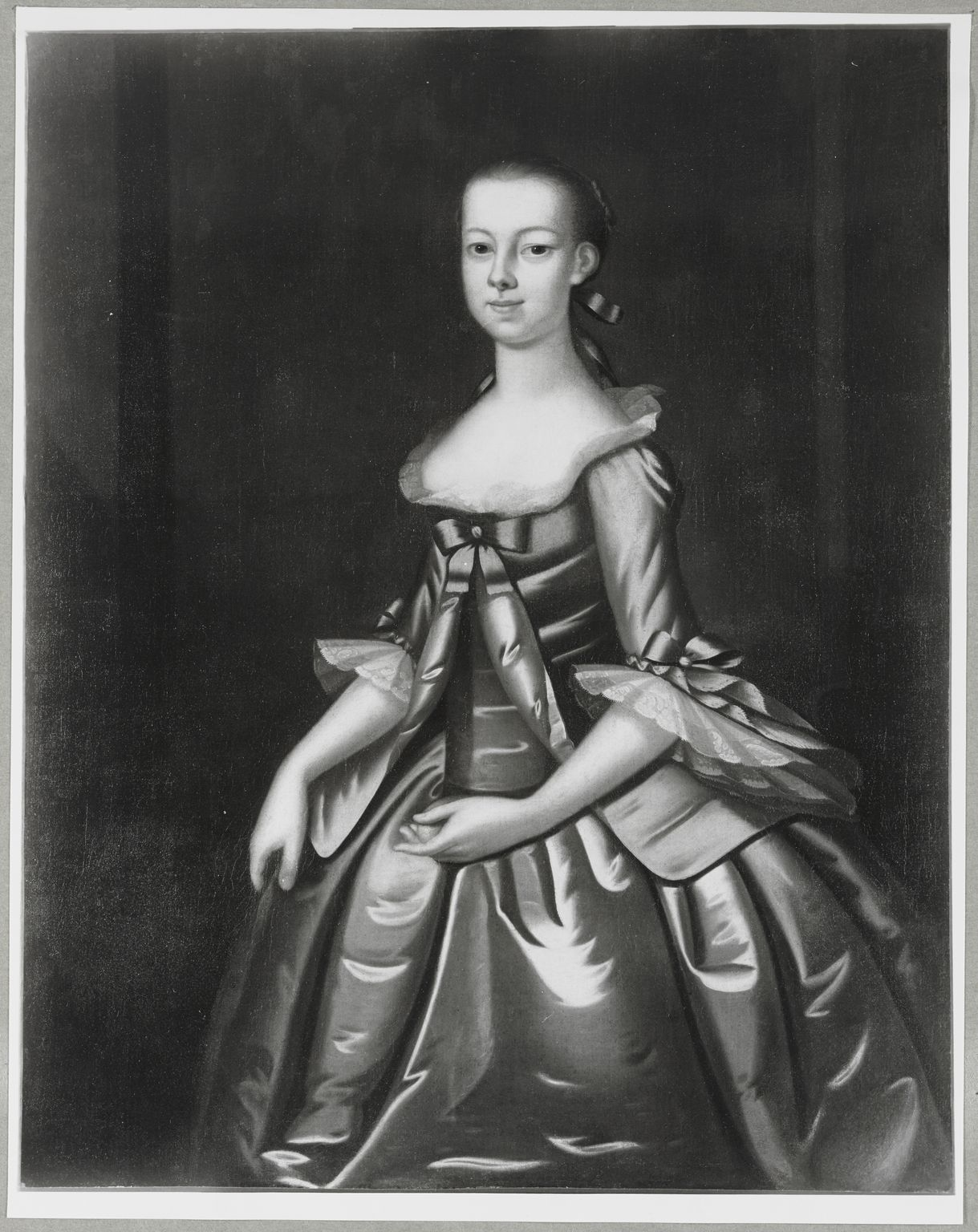
Portrait of William's wife Rebecca Moore Smith, by Benjamin West

Smith courted and married Moore's daughter, Rebecca, and had seven children. Their grandson William Rudolph Smith became a politician who served in both the Pennsylvania and Wisconsin state legislatures. Another grandson, Richard Penn Smith, was a playwright and author.

Smith had a difficult personality and has been described as "haughty, slovenly and often offensive in company". He was also known to be a drunk toward the end of his life. His funeral was not attended by any of his children.

== Career ==
He worked as a clerk in the Society for the Propagation of the Gospel, and as a tutor in Scotland and for the two children of Josiah Martin in Long Island, New York. As the Martins' tutor, he wrote to Benjamin Franklin in 1750 to enquire about their enrollment into the Academy of Philadelphia. He included his pamphlet titled "A General Idea of the College of Mirania". In Latin, Mirania means "land of marvels". It outlined his thoughts about education and the development of a college in New York. The book was read by Benjamin Franklin and Richard Peters and greatly impressed them. They asked Smith to teach Logic, Rhetoric, Natural and Moral Philosophy at the Academy and Charitable School of Philadelphia.

In 1755 Smith became the first provost (the equivalent of the modern post of university president) of the school. He held the post until 1779. Smith was an Anglican priest and together with William Moore, Smith was briefly jailed in 1758 for his criticism of the military policy in the Quaker-run colony. Indeed, during the French and Indian War, Smith published two anti-Quaker pamphlets that advocated the disenfranchisement of all Quakers, who were the political elite in Pennsylvania. However, their pacifist beliefs made it difficult for the Quakers in government to provide funds for defense, and as a result anti-Quaker sentiment ran high, especially in the backcountry which suffered from frequent raids from Indians allied with the French. Smith's second pamphlet, A Brief View of the Conduct of Pennsylvania, For the Year 1755 (1756), actually went so far as to suggest that while one way of "ridding our Assembly of Quakers" would be to require an oath, "another way of getting rid of them" would be "by cutting their Throats." Smith's virulent attacks on Quakers alienated him from Franklin, who was closely allied with the Pennsylvania Assembly.

Smith advocated for the Church of England to appoint a bishop in America, a highly controversial proposal insofar as many Americans feared any ecclesiastical institution that might compel compliance with the force of royal authority. Smith received honorary Doctor of Divinity degrees from the University of Oxford and the University of Aberdeen in 1759 and from Trinity College, Dublin in 1763. In 1768 he became a member of the American Philosophical Society.

Smith was also the founding editor of The American Magazine, or Monthly Chronicle for the British Colonies, the first publication of its kind, which appeared from October 1757 until October 1758, when publication ceased owing to Smith's incarceration due to the previously mentioned libel action initiated by the Pennsylvania Assembly.

Smith's best known work as an author is "Bouquet's Expedition Against the Ohio Indians in 1764" (1765), an account of the last campaign in Pontiac's War, led by Colonel Henry Bouquet.

Records shows that Smith owned one enslaved person in 1769.

When the American Revolution broke out, Smith was in a bind. As an Anglican priest, he was viewed as a Loyalist, and was the suspected author of a series of anti-independence publications known as Cato's Letters. But his sentiments were far more sympathetic towards the Patriots than otherwise, even to the point of founding a college named for George Washington, the commander-in-chief of the Patriot Continental Army, in the midst of war. He was appointed to serve on the Philadelphia Committee of Correspondence in 1774, along with such notables as John Dickinson, Samuel Miles, and Joseph Reed.

In 1780, Smith moved to Chestertown, Maryland, where he founded and become the first president of Washington College, an institution that he intended to be the premiere academic institution of the region; it received almost exclusive patronage from the first President of the United States, George Washington. Smith continued to own enslaved persons while president of Washington College. He brought one teenage girl with him, acquired a second slave in 1783 and sold a third in 1803 who had tried twice to escape.

After the war, he returned to Philadelphia, where he briefly regained his post at Penn. He invested his fortune in land and owned approximately 70,000 acres. He founded and designed the town of Huntingdon, Pennsylvania, which was named after Selina Hastings, Countess of Huntingdon, one of the main benefactors to the Academy of Philadelphia. Smith's sons were the first leaders of the city government.

== Efforts for American Anglicanism ==
Selina Hastings, Countess of Huntingdon, was a patron of William Smith's and had some unfortunate personal tragedies which motivated her interest in the spread of religion. Incidentally, Smith named his real estate venture Huntingdon in her honor. This was along the Juniata River, in central Pennsylvania. Lady Huntingdon was persuaded that the Church of England needed to return to the path of righteousness. The Wesleys (John Wesley, Charles Wesley) and George Whitefield whom she supported, in addition to Smith's interests, found it easier to work towards righteousness in the "low" church or what became called Methodism or the "Methodist Movement."

To further show the problems that the colonials had with the Church of England, William Smith, seemed to be right in the middle of things. The May 1, 1760, first free and voluntary Convention of the American (Anglican) Priesthood met at Christ Church, Philadelphia, Dr. Smith presiding. The attendees wanted and needed an American Episcopate (bishop). Smith worked towards that goal.

There was a very practical element here. To obtain more priests for work in the colonies, ordination of priests had to be done by a bishop. The bishop was in England. The trip to and from England in those days was risky. Many prospective priests and those recently ordained didn't survive the trip. Thus, there was a supply problem with priests in the colonies. The Bishop of London had superintendency of the colonies but was not going to do anything that would incur Royal disfavor.

Smith was having trouble getting the Privy Council in England to pay attention to his pleas for the King to approve the consecration of a bishop that would reside in the American colonies. Archbishop of Canterbury Secker also sensed that the time was not yet right. The King was the Head of the Church of England, the same King the Americans revolted against. A modern look back at this period indicates that King George III's "mental" illness of an inherited biochemical etiology (porphyria) was rather unpredictable and caused great havoc in the order of things.

No approval ever came for an American bishop before the Revolution. Afterwards, the American priests turned to the Scottish bishops to consecrate Rev. Samuel Seabury, the first American bishop of the Protestant Episcopal Church. This was always viewed as "almost proper." Thus, perfection in this matter had to wait until things settled down in the post-Revolutionary era.

With all the political activity by Smith working for an American bishop on both sides of the Atlantic, the question obviously was why didn't Smith become elevated to that station? The reports handed down were that Rev. Dr. Smith was "too fond of the grape" to be worthy of such consecration.

== Death and legacy ==
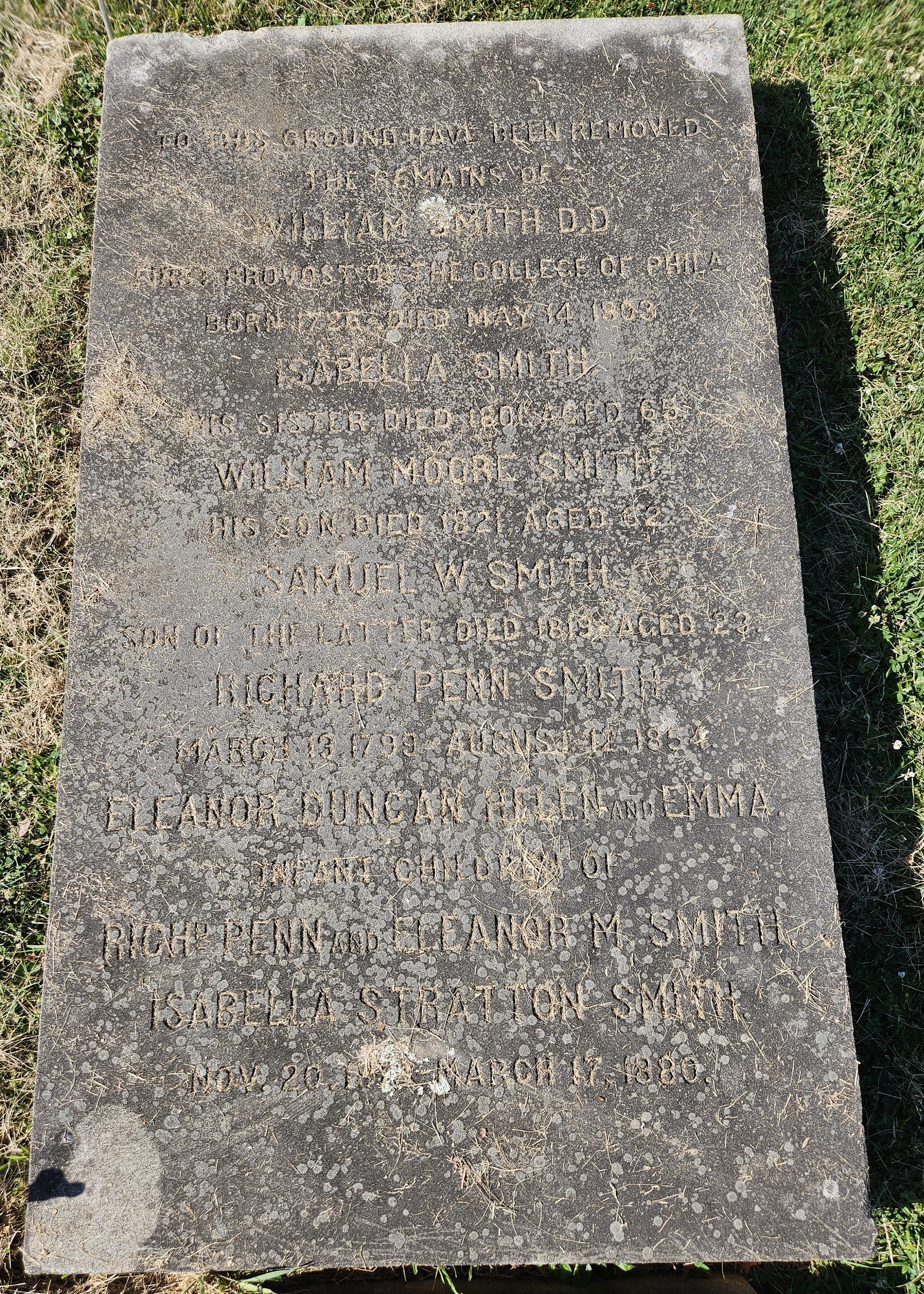
William Smith Grave in Laurel Hill Cemetery

He died on May 14, 1803. His remains were re-interred to Laurel Hill Cemetery in Philadelphia in 1854.

The Provost Smith Lounge at the Fisher Hassenfeld College House at the University of Pennsylvania was named in his honor.

William Smith Street in Huntingdon, Pennsylvania, was named in his honor.

== Publications ==
- A Sermon on the Present Situation of American Affairs, Philadelphia: James Humphreys, 1775
- An Oration in Memory of General Montgomery, and of the Officers and Soldiers, who Fell with Him, December 31, 1775, Philadelphia: John Dunlap, 1776
- A Sermon on Temporal and Spiritual Salvation, Philadelphia: T. Dobson, 1790

== Sources ==
- Fletcher, Charlotte Goldsborough (2002), Cato's Mirania - A Life of Provost Smith with a General Idea of the College of Mirania, Lanham, Maryland: University Press of America, Inc., ISBN 978-0-7618-2379-7
- Fox, Bertha Sprague (July 1941). "Provost William Smith and his Land Investments in Pennsylvania". Pennsylvania History. VIII (3): 189–209.
- Smith, Horace Wemyss (1880a), Life and Correspondence of the Rev. William Smith, D.D., Volume 1, Philadelphia: Ferguson Bros. & Co.
- Smith, Horace Wemyss (1880b), Life and Correspondence of the Rev. William Smith, D.D., Volume 2, Philadelphia: Ferguson Bros. & Co.
- Stille, Charles J. (1869), A Memoir of Rev. William Smith, D.D., Provost of the College Academy and Charitable School of Philadelphia, Philadelphia: Moore & Sons, ISBN 978-0-524-06108-4

Academic offices
Preceded by Benjamin Franklin as Provost of the Academy of Pennsylvania	Provost of the College of Philadelphia; 1754–1779	Succeeded by John Ewing as Provost of the University of Pennsylvania
Preceded by New Title	President of Washington College; 1782-1789	Succeeded by Colin Ferguson
