= Daniel Z. Gibson =

American academic administrator (1908–1984)

Daniel Zachary Gibson
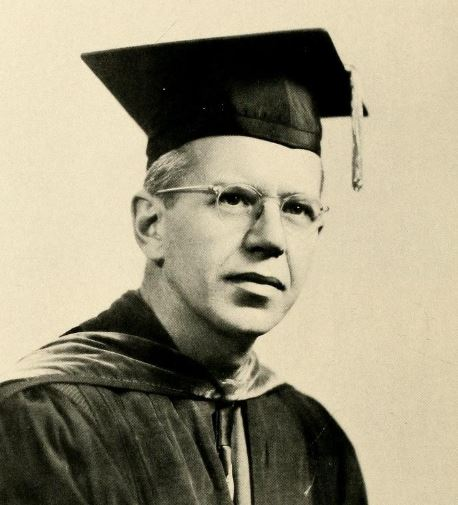

Academic background
- Education: University of Cincinnati

Academic work
- Discipline: English literature
- Institutions: The Citadel; Franklin and Marshall College

President of Washington College
- In office 1950–1970
- Preceded by: Fredrick G. Livingood
- Succeeded by: Charles J. Merdinger

Personal details
- Born: 26 January 1908 Middlesboro, Kentucky
- Died: 23 April 1984 (aged 76) Chestertown, Maryland
- Spouse: Helen Schaefer Gibson (1936–his death)
- Children: Linda Gibson Wood (1933–2020), Daniel Douglas Gibson (1942), Laurent Gibson Swander (1944–2005), Jillian Clark Gibson (1948–)

Daniel Zachary Gibson (26 January 1908 – 23 April 1984) was an American academic and academic administrator. He served in various roles at Cincinnati Conservatory of Music, The Citadel, Franklin and Marshall College, Washington College, and Salisbury University. During World War II, Gibson served as an officer in the United States Naval Reserve.

== Biography ==
Daniel Gibson was born in Middlesboro, Kentucky in 1908. He attended secondary school there and earned his bachelor's degree at Kentucky Wesleyan College in 1929. In 1931, he earned his master's degree from the University of Cincinnati in English and started teaching at the Cincinnati Conservatory of Music. Gibson earned his doctorate in English literature from the University of Cincinnati in 1939. The following year, he became an assistant professor of English at The Citadel, which he held until 1943.

In 1943, Gibson resigned his post at The Citadel and accepted a commission in the United States Naval Reserve. For the duration of World War II, Gibson was assigned to Franklin and Marshall College as the Executive Officer of the V-12 Navy College Training Program detachment. At war's end, Gibson was discharged from the navy and accepted an posting as an associate professor of English at Franklin and Marshall in 1946. Later that year, he was promoted to Dean of the college.

Gibson became the president of Washington College, in Chestertown, Maryland, in 1950. The next year, he announced that the college would no longer be supporting a football team. Over the next 20 years, the college campus, faculty, and endowment would double in size. The school's enrollment also grew from 328 to 800. Outside of the college, Gibson was a member of the Ornithological Society chapter in Kent County, Maryland. In 1970, Gibson resigned as president due to failing health.

After his time at Washington College, Gibson was the dean of Salisbury University for 18 months. Gibson died of Parkinson's disease on April 23, 1984, in Chestertown, Maryland.

== Personal life ==
Daniel Gibson married Helen Schaefer Gibson in 1936 and had four children.
