= Francis Waters =

American Methodist minister

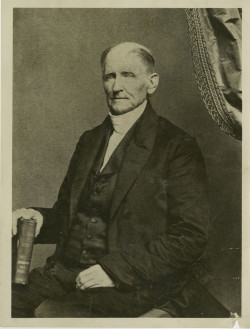
- Born: January 17, 1792
- Died: April 23, 1868 (aged 76)
- Occupation: Minister; educator
- Employer: Washington College

Francis G. Waters, D.D., LL.D., (January 17, 1792 – April 23, 1868) was a Methodist minister from Baltimore, Maryland, U.S., and a founding member of the Methodist Protestant Church. He was elected as the first president of the church on November 2, 1830, and presided over the general convention, in which the church's constitution was adopted. From 1849 to 1853 Waters served as the second principal of Baltimore City College. He was selected as president of Madison College in Uniontown, Pennsylvania, in summer 1853 but left the institution later that fall because of family illness. He also served twice as the Principal of Washington College in Chestertown, Maryland.

Academic offices
Preceded by Gerard E. Stack	Principal of Washington College; 1818–1823	Succeeded by Timothy Clowes
Preceded by Dr. Nathan C. Brooks	Principal of Baltimore City College; 1849–1853	Succeeded by John A. Getty
Preceded by Richard W. Ringgold	Principal of Washington College; 1854–1860	Succeeded by Andrew J. Sutton
