= Douglass Cater =

American journalist, political aide and college president (1923–1995)

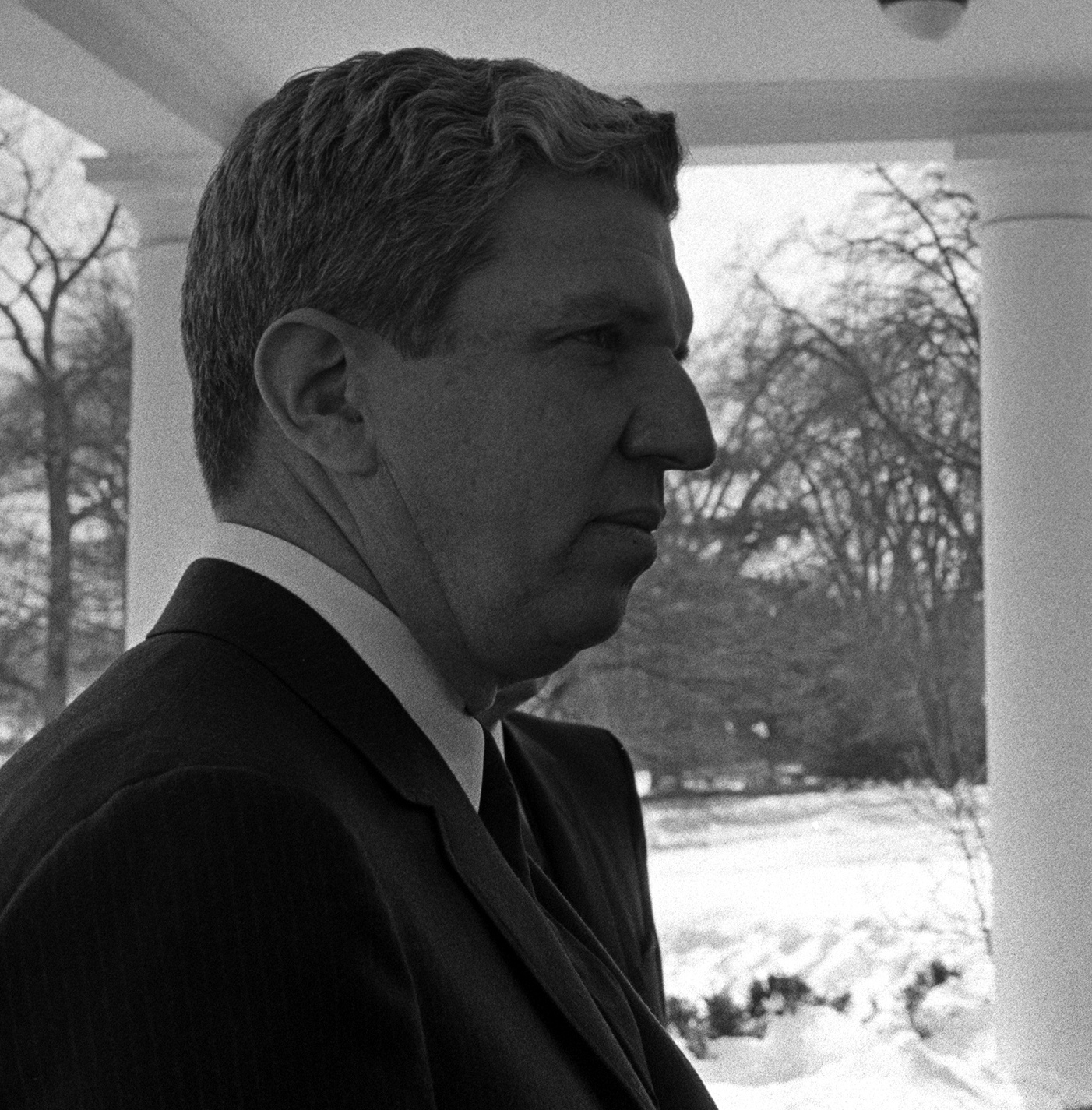

President of Washington College
- In office 1982–1991
- Preceded by: Garry E. Clarke
- Succeeded by: Charles H. Trout

Special Assistant to the President
- In office 1964–1968
- President: Lyndon B. Johnson

Personal details
- Born: August 24, 1923 Montgomery, Alabama
- Died: September 15, 1995 (aged 72) Chestertown, Maryland
- Spouse: Libby Anderson Cater
- Children: 4
- Education: Harvard University

Silas Douglass Cater Jr. (August 24, 1923 – September 15, 1995) was an American journalist, political aide, and college president. Cater started his career as a journalist for The Reporter and, in 1964, became an aide for Lyndon B. Johnson. After his time in the White House, Cater was a fellow at the Aspen Institute and the vice chairman of The Observer. In 1982, Cater became the 22nd president of Washington College. He retired to Montgomery, Alabama in 1991 and died in 1995.

== Early life and education ==
Douglass Cater was born in Montgomery, Alabama on August 24, 1923, to Nancy Chesnutt Cater and Silas Douglass Cater Sr. His father was a local elected official, Alabama State Senator, and lawyer. Cater was educated at Phillips Exeter Academy and Harvard University. While at Harvard, he wrote for The Harvard Crimson. During World War II, Cater interrupted his education and served in the Office of Strategic Services as a Russia analyst. While finishing his studies at Harvard, he helped found the United States Student Association.

== The Reporter ==
In 1950, Cater became a journalist for The Reporter, serving as the Washington editor and the national affairs editor. While a journalist, Cater wrote The Fourth Branch of Government which examined how the press can be used to further disinformation by unquestioningly printing the statements of politicians. The book concentrated on the Second Red Scare and how Joseph McCarthy used the press to further his goals.

== Johnson administration ==
Between 1964 and 1968, Cater served as a Special Assistant to the President in the Johnson administration. Near the beginning of his time at the White House, in 1964, Cater wrote a memorandum that convinced Lyndon B. Johnson that he should concentrate on education policy. This led Cater to be the point person on Great Society priorities such as education and health care. Major legislation that Cater helped pass included the Elementary and Secondary Education Act, which provided direct federal funding for public education, and the Public Broadcasting Act of 1967. Cater left the White House in 1968 to serve as a domestic advisor for Hubert Humphrey's 1968 presidential campaign.

== Post-political career ==
In 1970, Cater joined the Aspen Institute as a senior fellow. Later that decade after Robert Orville Anderson purchased The Observer, Cater became the publication's vice chairman.

Cater became the president of Washington College, in Chestertown, Maryland, in 1982. As President, Cater expanded the college's endowment and revamped the academic program. He also defended the institution of the small American liberal arts college in the press. Cater retired to Montgomery, Alabama in 1991 and died four years later, on September 15, 1995, from pulmonary fibrosis at the guest house at Washington College in Chestertown, Maryland.

== Personal life ==
Cater was married to Libby Anderson Cater. The Caters had two sons, Silas and Ben, and two daughters, Sage and Morrow.

== Publications ==
- Cater, Douglass (1959). The Fourth Branch of Government. Boston: Houghton Mifflin.
- Cater, Douglass (1964). Power in Washington: A Critical Look at Today's Struggle to Govern in the Nation's Capital. New York: Random House. ISBN 978-0394441122.
- Cater, Douglass (1970). Dana, the Irrelevant Man. New York: McGraw-Hill.
- Cater, Douglass (1975). Television as a Social Force: New Approaches to TV Criticism. New York: Praeger. ISBN 978-0275011901.
- Cater, Douglass; Myhan, Michael J., eds. (1976). The Future of Public Broadcasting. New York: Praeger. ISBN 978-0275569907.
