= United States Special Envoy for Northern Ireland =

Diplomat mediating the Northern Ireland Peace Process

Special Envoy for Northern Ireland
- Seal of the United States Department of State
- Incumbent; Vacant since December 13, 2024
- United States Department of State
- Appointer: President of the United States
- Inaugural holder: George J. Mitchell
- Formation: 1995; 31 years ago

The United States Special Envoy for Northern Ireland (officially the Special Envoy of the President and the Secretary of State for Northern Ireland) is the top U.S. diplomat supporting the Northern Ireland peace process. The position was last held by Joe Kennedy III, appointed by President Joe Biden on December 19, 2022.

== Origins ==
Before the 1980s, U.S. leaders were reluctant to get involved in the Troubles in Northern Ireland. When Bill Clinton was on the campaign trail as the Democratic candidate for president in 1992, he suggested both orally and in a letter to Congressman Bruce Morrison that he would favor the appointment of a Special Envoy for Northern Ireland. Clinton was not alone in supporting a more active U.S. involvement in Northern Ireland. On February 23, 1993, shortly after Clinton assumed office as president, Representative Joseph P. Kennedy, together with 16 co-sponsors, sponsored a Congressional Resolution calling for the appointment of a Special Envoy. The Resolution called that it be:

Resolved by the House of Representatives (the Senate concurring), That it is the sense of the Congress that the President should appoint a special envoy who will be personally and actively involved in bringing about a solution to the present conflict in Northern Ireland, including encouraging and facilitating negotiations among all parties to the conflict who agree to end the use of violence.

However, the proposed Resolution initially came to nothing. Nevertheless, Clinton discussed the prospect of appointing a Special Envoy with the Irish premier, Albert Reynolds when the two leaders first met on St. Patrick's Day in 1993. However Clinton deferred any appointment. When the Provisional Irish Republican Army (IRA) declared a ceasefire in 1994, Sinn Féin party leader, Gerry Adams urged Washington to play a "nudging role" as it did in South Africa and the Middle East. Congressman Bruce Morrison was considered a potential candidate.

== George Mitchell ==
Bill Clinton's 1992 campaign promise to appoint a peace envoy to Belfast initially "infuriated" the British Government. No appointment was made until 1995, when Clinton selected former U.S. senator George J. Mitchell as Special Envoy. Mitchell was recognised as being more than a token envoy but someone representing a President with a deep interest in events. However, around the time of Mitchell's appointment, it was agreed with both the prime minister of the United Kingdom John Major and Taoiseach John Bruton that Mitchell would chair an international commission on disarmament of paramilitary groups. Mitchell went on to successfully chair the talks that resulted in the Good Friday Agreement.

James (Jim) Lyons succeeded Sen George Mitchell as Special Advisor to the President and Secretary of State for Economic Initiatives in Northern Ireland and the Border Counties of the Republic in 1996. He had previously been appointed US Observer to the International Fund for Ireland (IFI) by President Clinton in 1993. Combing both roles, Lyons oversaw US participation in IFI cross community projects. He coordinated the efforts of US agencies for inward foreign investment and cross Atlantic business to business partnerships and joint ventures. He also developed the Northern Ireland micro lending fund, Aspire, which was the first such fund in western Europe. Lyons served in both roles until the end of the Clinton Administration in 2001. Independent review confirmed that the US contribution to the IFI exceeded $100 million and assisted in funding over 4,000 projects which created some 22,000 permanent jobs and leveraged investment of approximately $2 billion (The independent KPMG audit of the International (IFI) Fund and a review of the Fund by a British-Irish Interparliamentary Committee).

== Later envoys ==
The United States has continued to support the full implementation of the Good Friday Agreement and has demonstrated its readiness to assist the process in any way. On June 10, 2003, President George W. Bush announced his intention to designate Ambassador Richard N. Haass as the Special Envoy. Haass was an active Envoy. In 2001, within a week of the September 11 attacks, Haass warned Irish Republicans that the suspected links between the IRA and Colombian terrorist groups could have "potentially serious consequences for the role of the United States in the peace process". Later, Haass attacked then Ulster Unionist Party leader David Trimble for setting a deadline for pulling out of power-sharing, accusing him of adding to a sense of crisis.

Later, Mitchell Reiss was appointed as the Special Envoy. At the invitation of the British and Irish governments, Reiss participated in the peace process negotiations that took place at Leeds Castle in 2004. On February 15, 2007, Paula Dobriansky, U.S. Undersecretary for Democracy and Global Affairs at the State Department, was named the special envoy for Northern Ireland. The transition from the former Special Envoy, Ambassador Mitchell Reiss, took place on February 15, 2007. In February 2008, Special Envoy Dobriansky led a trade mission to Belfast. Until the inauguration of Donald Trump, the Special Envoy was former Colorado senator, Gary Hart. On March 6, 2020, President Trump appointed his former acting chief of staff Mick Mulvaney to fill this position.

Each of the Special Envoys has periodically reported to U.S. Congressional committees on their activities and the status of the Northern Ireland peace process and other matters concerning Northern Ireland.

== Future ==
The United States has at times contemplated whether to terminate the position of U.S. Special Envoy for Northern Ireland. In 2001, then U.S. Secretary of State Colin Powell stated in response to questions that:

It is not yet clear whether a special Northern Ireland envoy, such as the role played by former Senator George Mitchell, will be appointed, but the State Department will identify someone in the department to take on "as a primary additional duty" serving in a communication role ... [adding that appointing such an envoy will be taken under advisement] if the situation moves in a way that suggests it takes that kind of high-level special envoy involvement.

During the 2008 U.S. presidential campaign in the United States, Democratic Party candidate Barack Obama was reported in The Irish Times as having questioned the necessity to keep a U.S. Special Envoy for Northern Ireland. This drew a robust response from the Republican Party candidate, Senator John McCain, who strongly backed retaining a U.S. Special Envoy for Northern Ireland. The Senator criticized Senator Obama's position as demonstrating a willingness:

to toss aside one of the signature diplomatic accomplishments of the Clinton administration and put the progress in Northern Ireland at risk is only further evidence that he is simply not ready to lead.

The position became vacant on January 7, 2021, following the resignation of special ambassador, Mick Mulvaney, who resigned in response to President Donald Trump's role in the 2021 storming of the United States Capitol. Almost two years later, President Joe Biden appointed former U.S. representative Joe Kennedy III of Massachusetts to the position in December 2022.

== List ==
No.	Portrait	Officeholder	Term start	Term end	President
1		George J. Mitchell	3 January 1995	20 January 2001	Bill Clinton
2		Richard N. Haass	6 February 2001	12 July 2003	George W. Bush
3		Mitchell Reiss	27 August 2003	11 January 2007	George W. Bush
4		Paula Dobriansky	15 February 2007	20 January 2009	George W. Bush
5	N/A	Declan Kelly	14 September 2009	11 May 2011	Barack Obama
vacant
6		Gary Hart	21 October 2014	20 January 2017	Barack Obama
vacant
7		Mick Mulvaney	1 May 2020	6 January 2021	Donald Trump
vacant
8		Joe Kennedy III	19 December 2022	13 December 2024	Joe Biden
vacant
