= Cato's Letters (loyalist) =

Cato's Letters were a series of essays arguing against American independence in the Pennsylvania Gazette which were published in April 1776.

== Authorship ==
According to Thomas Paine biographer Moncure D. Conway, this "Cato" was Reverend Dr. William Smith, an influential Anglican minister in Philadelphia. His views were opposed in letters signed by "The Forester," apparently Paine.
