= Mark H. Erickson =

Mark H. Erickson was the thirteenth president of Wittenberg University from 2005 to 2012.

He graduated from Princeton University, Harvard Graduate School of Education, and Lehigh University.
