= University System of Maryland =

Public university system in Baltimore, Maryland, U.S.

- Type: Public university system
- Established: 1988
- Endowment: $1.965 billion (2022)
- Budget: $5.8 billion (2019)
- Chancellor: Jay A. Perman
- Total staff: 21,565 (2014)
- Location: Baltimore, Maryland, United States
- Website: www.usmd.edu

The University System of Maryland (USM) is a public university system in the U.S. state of Maryland. The system is composed of the eleven campuses at College Park, Baltimore County, Baltimore, Princess Anne, Towson, Salisbury, Bowie, Frostburg, Hagerstown, Rockville, Cambridge, and Adelphi, along with four regional higher education centers located throughout the state.

== History ==
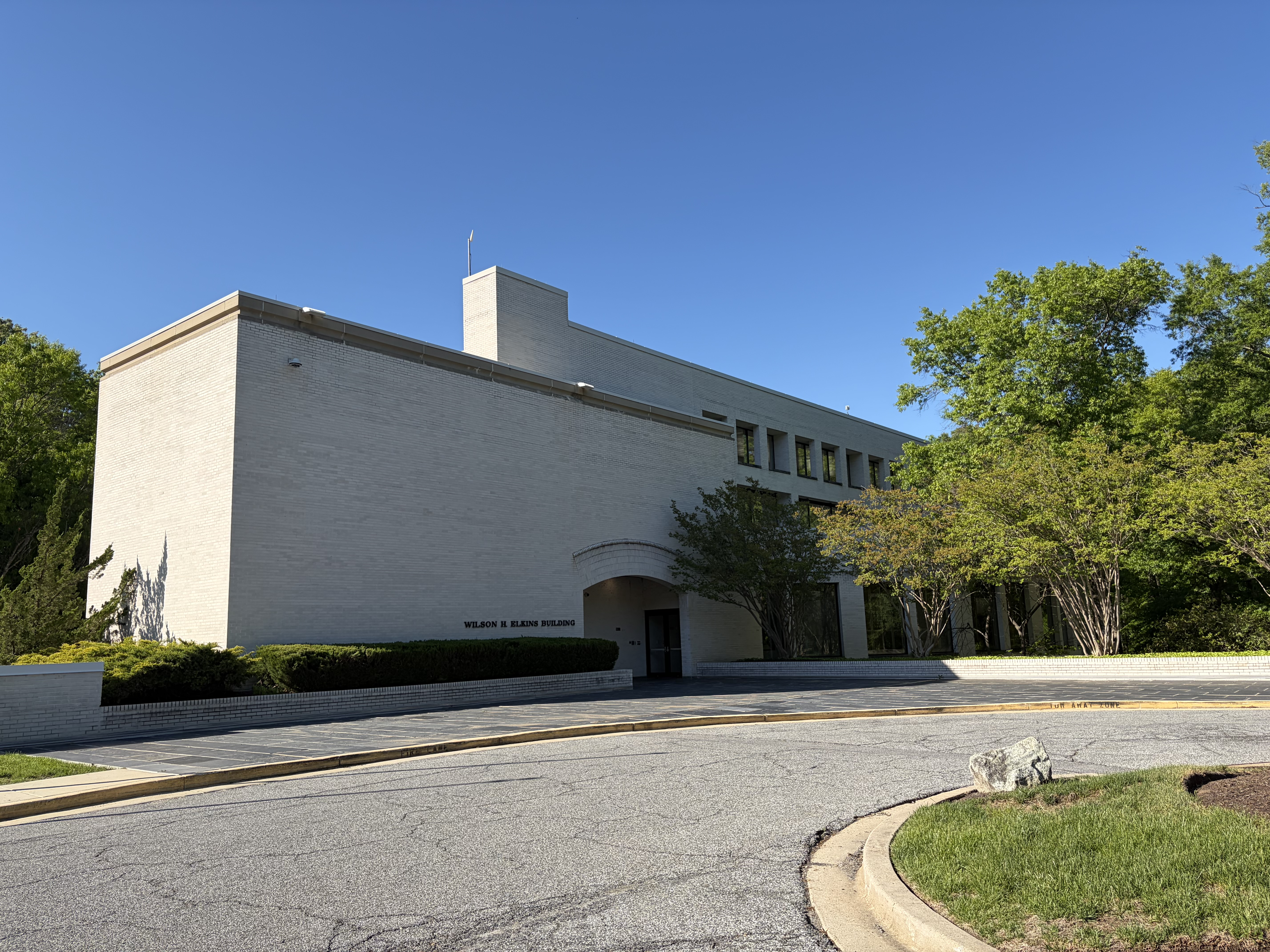
The Wilson H. Elkins Building, headquarters of the University System of Maryland in College Park

In 1974, Maryland, along with seven other states, mainly in the South, submitted plans to desegregate its state universities; Maryland's plans were approved by the U.S. Department of Health, Education and Welfare. The University System of Maryland was created in 1988 from the merger of University of Maryland (UM) and Board of Trustees of State Universities and Colleges (BTSUC).

== Campuses ==
USM campuses
Campus	City	Established	Undergraduate enrollment	Category	Athletics
University of Maryland Global Campus	Adelphi	1947	47,250	UM	N/A
University of Maryland, College Park	College Park	1856	30,760	UM (flagship)	Big Ten (NCAA Division I)
University of Maryland, Baltimore County	Catonsville	1966	11,060	UM	AmEast (NCAA Division I)
University of Maryland Eastern Shore	Princess Anne	1886	2,335	UM (HBCU)	MEAC (NCAA Division I)
University of Maryland, Baltimore	Baltimore	1807	930	UM	N/A
Towson University	Towson	1866	18,810	State Univ.	CAA (NCAA Division I)
Salisbury University	Salisbury	1930	7,650	State Univ.	C2C (NCAA Division III)
Bowie State University	Bowie	1865	5,230	State Univ. (HBCU)	CIAA (NCAA Division II)
Frostburg State University	Frostburg	1898	4,640	State Univ.	MEC (NCAA Division II)
University of Baltimore	Baltimore	1925	2,825	State Univ.	N/A
Coppin State University	Baltimore	1900	2,380	State Univ. (HBCU)	MEAC (NCAA Division I)
Universities at Shady Grove	Rockville	2000	—	Regional center	N/A
USM at Hagerstown	Hagerstown	2005	—	Regional center	N/A
USM in Southern Maryland	California	2019	—	Regional center	N/A
UM Center for Environmental Science	Cambridge	1925	—	Research center	N/A
University of Maryland, Biotechnology Institute	Baltimore	1985	—	Research center	N/A

With more than 172,000 students at all levels, USM institutions award 78% of bachelor's degrees in Maryland.

== Finances ==
Nearly 50 percent of undergraduates graduate without debt. USM institutions attract more than $1.4 billion in research and development funding to the state annually and have helped foster the creation of more than 700 startup companies since 2011. The system's Aa1 bond rating enables its institutions to borrow at lower costs to students, families and taxpayers. Related effectiveness and efficiency initiatives have saved Marylanders nearly $600 million in administrative costs since 2004.

== Governance ==
The USM is governed by a board of regents and led by a chancellor, who is the CEO of the university system and leads the USM Office.

=== USM Board of Regents ===
A 17-member volunteer Board of Regents, including one full-time student, governs the University System of Maryland. Appointed by the governor, the regents oversee the system's academic, administrative, and financial operations; formulate policy; and appoint the USM chancellor and the presidents of the system's 12 institutions. With the exception of the student member, each regent is appointed for a term of five years, and may not serve more than two consecutive terms. The student regent is appointed for a one-year term, and may be reappointed. Regents serve on the board without compensation.

=== USM chancellors ===
The following persons have served as chancellor of the University System of Maryland:

No.	Image	Chancellor	Term start	Term end	Ref.
1		John S. Toll	July 1, 1988 (Note: The University System of Maryland came into being on July 1, 1988, by an act of the state legislature.)	September 4, 1989 (Note: Forced to resign by regents.)	
interim		James A. Norton	September 5, 1989	June 30, 1990	
2		Donald Langenberg	July 1, 1990	April 30, 2002	
interim		Joseph F. Vivona	May 1, 2002	July 31, 2002	
3		William E. Kirwan	August 1, 2002	June 30, 2015	
4		Robert L. Caret	July 1, 2015	January 5, 2020	
5		Jay A. Perman	January 6, 2020	present	

Table notes:

== USM Office ==
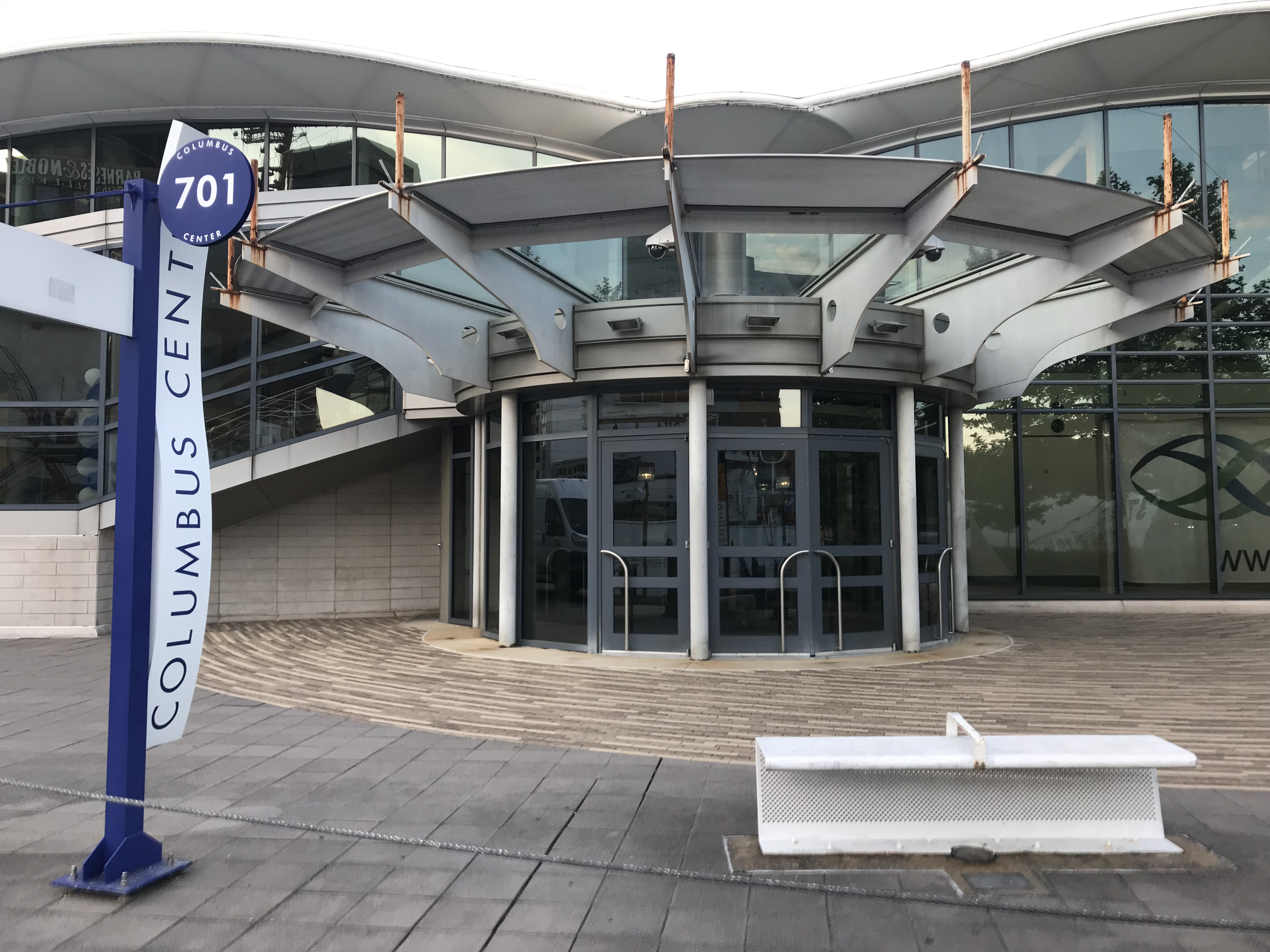
The entrance of the USM chancellor's office at 701 East Pratt Street in Baltimore

The USM Office, led by the system chancellor, is the staff to the Board of Regents. Staff members advocate on behalf of the 12 USM institutions, facilitate collaboration and efficiencies among the institutions, and provide information about the system to the public.

With leadership from the USM Board of Regents and the chancellor, the system office coordinates academic programs, assists with long-range planning and resource management, facilitates private fund raising, and provides financial stewardship.

The system office is headquartered in Baltimore, and has locations in College Park (Adelphi postal address), Annapolis, and Columbia. Formerly the Adelphi office was the headquarters of the entire system.

== See also ==
- List of colleges and universities in Maryland
