= Charles H. Trout =

American historian and college President (1935–2006)

Charles H. Trout (November 3, 1935 – September 27, 2006) was a historian and college president. He served as president of Washington College for five years (1990–1995) and then president of Harcum College for four years.

Trout earned received his Bachelor of Arts from Amherst College and his Master of Arts and Ph.D. from Columbia University. His teaching career began at The Hill School in Pottstown, Pennsylvania, and Phillips Exeter Academy in Exeter, New Hampshire. He joined the faculty of Mount Holyoke College in Massachusetts in 1969 and became chairman of its history department. While at Mount Holyoke, he was named a National Endowment for the Humanities Senior Fellow and a Charles Warren Fellow at Harvard University.

Trout moved to Colgate University in New York in 1981, where he served as provost for a ten years before becoming the president of Washington College in 1990. He later served as president of Harcum College for four years.

Trout was the author of Boston, the Great Depression, and the New Deal (Oxford University Press, 1977).

Trout died in 2006 from complications from blood cancer.
