= Manual Crimsons football =

- First season: 1893
- Head coach: Keith Eckloff; 3rd season,
- Location: Louisville, Kentucky
- Stadium: Manual Stadium (capacity: 11,700)
- Conference: Kentucky High School Athletic Association
- All-time record: 662–450–37 (.592)

National championships
- Claimed: 2 (1925, 1938)
- Rivalries: Male Bulldogs
- Fight song: Stand Up and Cheer
- Marching band: The Crimson Sound

The Manual Crimsons football program is a high school football team that represents duPont Manual High School ("Manual"). The team is currently a member of the Kentucky High School Athletic Association.

== History ==
Manual students first organized a football team in 1892. The team won the Kentucky State Championship six times; in 1925, 1936, 1938, 1948, 1959, and 1966. The 1925 and 1938 teams claimed National Champions status due to their undefeated records and defeats of other top national teams, but the 1925 claim is considered a mythical national championship because there was no tournament. The National Sports News Service gave the 1938 High School Football National Championship to Manual. On December 31 of that year, Manual defeated New Britain, Connecticut, in a national championship game in Baton Rouge, Louisiana. The game was sponsored by the Louisiana Sports Association, which was affiliated with the Sugar Bowl.

== Rivalry with the Male Bulldogs ==
Manual's rivalry with the Male Bulldogs, dubbed "The Old Rivalry," dates directly to 1893 and is the oldest high school rivalry in Kentucky. The most recent winning team holds a trophy referred to as "The Barrel." The rivalry was fueled in its early years by class differences between college-bound Male students and "blue collar" Manual students. The Louisville Post wrote in 1897 that "[Male's school colors] have always waved triumphant over the Red of the 'blacksmiths' as their more cultured opponents are wont to dub them". The game, traditionally played on Thanksgiving Day, was hotly contested and widely attended, with 10,000 spectators attending as early as 1909. The rivalry paused when the schools (and football teams) were consolidated from 1915 to 1918 but was renewed in 1919 after Manual reformed and built its own stadium. Attendance averaged 14,000 from the 1920s through 1957, when crowds were so large that the schools began holding the game at Cardinal Stadium, with a capacity of over 20,000. The record attendance was 22,000 in 1966. Due to changes in the state athletics schedules the Thanksgiving Day game tradition ended in 1980 amid protests from fans, and the game was moved to late October.

== Notable players and coaches ==
- Mike Basrak
- Keenan Burton
- Sherman Lewis
- Aidan Robbins
- Travis Prentice
- Steve Wright
