= List of high school football rivalries more than 100 years old =

There are several dozen high school football rivalries in the United States that are more than 100 years old. The oldest ongoing rivalry is between two Connecticut high schools, Norwich Free Academy in Norwich and New London High School in New London. The ongoing annual rivalry between Norwich Free Academy and New London High School began in 1875, though it has not been played continuously due to games not played during World War I. As of 2023, the most-played among these rivalries is one between two schools in Hawaii, Punahou and Kamehameha Schools' Honolulu campus, first played in 1903. The schools often play each other multiple times a year due to post-season match-ups, currently at 195 games.

== 1870s and 1880s ==
Series leader	Series rival	Series record	Series began	Notes	References
Norwich Free Academy (Norwich, Connecticut)	New London High School (New London, Connecticut)	78–66–11	1875; 151 years ago	Annual Thanksgiving football game, one of the original annual Thanksgiving football games.	
Cincinnati Hughes (Cincinnati, Ohio)	Cincinnati Woodward (Cincinnati, Ohio)	69–52–9 through 2025	1878; 148 years ago	Annual; Oldest rivalry in Ohio and second oldest in American football. The first meeting was the initial high school football game in Ohio history.	
Phillips Academy Andover (Andover, Massachusetts)	Phillips Exeter Academy (Exeter, New Hampshire)	74–54–10	1878; 148 years ago	The oldest football rivalry between private American prep schools, waged between two schools 37 miles apart and founded in the 18th century by members of the Phillips family.	
Wellesley High School (Wellesley, Massachusetts)	Needham High School (Needham, Massachusetts)	65–60–9	1882; 144 years ago	Annual Thanksgiving Day game. First played Thanksgiving morning 1882 at Morton Field in Wellesley (named West Needham at the time). The oldest public high school rivalry. Notable games include a game at Fenway Park in Boston in 2015, won by Needham 12–7.	
Fordham Preparatory School (Bronx, New York)	Xavier High School (New York, New York)	49–39–3	1883; 143 years ago	Annual Thanksgiving football game. The oldest prep school rivals in New York City, with the 100th meeting in 2023.	
Milton Academy (Milton, Massachusetts)	Noble and Greenough School (Dedham, Massachusetts)		1886; 140 years ago	Annual football game. One of the oldest continual football rivalries in the nation.	
Groton School (Groton, Massachusetts)	St. Mark's School (Southborough, Massachusetts)	77–45–2	1886; 140 years ago	Annual football game. The oldest independent school league rivalry in the U.S.	
Boston Latin School (Boston, Massachusetts)	English High School (Boston, Massachusetts)	83–38–13	1887; 139 years ago	Annual Thanksgiving football game. It was the oldest continuous high school football rivalry in the U.S. until being cancelled during the COVID-19 pandemic in 2020. English won the 2021 meeting 66–42, the highest scoring edition of the series.	
Lawrenceville School (Lawrenceville, New Jersey)	The Hill School (Pottstown, Pennsylvania)	59–42–5	1887; 139 years ago	Annual football game. One of the oldest continual football rivalries in the nation.	
William Penn Charter School (Philadelphia, Pennsylvania)	Germantown Academy (Fort Washington, Pennsylvania)	80–33–11	1887; 139 years ago	One of the nation's oldest uninterrupted football rivalry between prep schools.	
Malden High School (Malden, Massachusetts)	Medford High School (Medford, Massachusetts)	70-59-10	1889; 137 years ago	Annual Thanksgiving football game. The 138th meeting was won by Malden 20–8. The games alternate each year between MacDonald Stadium in Malden and Hormel Stadium in Medford, and kickoff is always at 10:00 a.m.	
Baltimore City College (Baltimore, Maryland)	Baltimore Polytechnic Institute (Baltimore, Maryland)	68–63–6	1889; 137 years ago	The annual Poly–City Game is played at Morgan State University, first Saturday in November after more than 75 years on Thanksgiving Day. Oldest high school football rivalry in Maryland.	
Hyde Park Career Academy (Chicago, Illinois)	Englewood Technical Prep Academy (Chicago, Illinois)	56–46–6	1889; 137 years ago	Hyde Park and Englewood's first game took place in 1889. The winner of the annual game is awarded the Little Brown Shield, also known as The Lettermen Shield. Ended when Englewood closed in 2008.	
The Haverford School (Haverford, Pennsylvania)	Episcopal Academy (Newtown Square, Pennsylvania)	53–44–2	1889; 137 years ago	Annual EA Day or Episcopal–Haverford Day football game. The second-oldest high school football rivalry in Pennsylvania. It is also the second oldest football rivalry in the InterAc League.	

== 1890s ==
Series leader	Series rival	Series record	Series began	Notes	References
Utica Proctor (Utica, New York)	Rome Free Academy (Rome, New York)		1891; 135 years ago	Annual homecoming game but regular games throughout season.	
Winchester High School (Winchester, Massachusetts)	Woburn Memorial High School (Woburn, Massachusetts)	56–55–12	1891; 135 years ago	Annual Thanksgiving football game played uninterrupted from 1918 to 2019. 6 of the 12 ties have been scoreless.	
Beverly High School (Beverly, Massachusetts)	Salem High School (Salem, Massachusetts)	62–52–7	1891; 135 years ago	One of the oldest rivalries in Massachusetts, 121 games. Thanksgiving football.	
Newburyport High School (Newburyport, Massachusetts)	Amesbury High School (Amesbury, Massachusetts)	56–41–9	1891; 135 years ago	Annual Thanksgiving football game. Rivalry includes several unsanctioned games between 1891 and 1914.	
Central High School (Pueblo, Colorado)	Centennial High School (Pueblo, Colorado)	57–53–9	1892; 134 years ago	This rivalry is noted as being the oldest high school football rivalry West of the Mississippi River. There were no games held from 1908–1920. Played at Pueblo's Dutch Clark Stadium, known as The Bell Game as the winning school takes possession of an old train bell which was donated as a trophy in 1950.	
Abilene High School (Abilene, Kansas)	Chapman High School (Chapman, Kansas)		1892; 134 years ago	Annual football game, often serving as the Homecoming game for each team in alternating years. In 2009, this rivalry was also picked by ESPN as the greatest rivalry in Kansas.	
Northeast High School (Philadelphia, Pennsylvania)	Central High School (Philadelphia, Pennsylvania)	54–51–10	1892; 134 years ago	Annual Thanksgiving game. The Philadelphia area's most recognized Thanksgiving football tradition, the schools play each year for the wooden horse trophy.	
Cony High School (Augusta, Maine)	Gardiner High School (Gardiner, Maine)	65–55–10	1892; 134 years ago	Cony and Gardiner play in the Pine Tree Conference in Maine. The Cony–Gardiner game is a part of the annual Great American Rivalry Series.	
Louisville Male High School (Louisville, Kentucky)	duPont Manual High School (Louisville, Kentucky)	86–45–6	1893; 133 years ago	Dubbed "The Old Rivalry", it is the oldest high school rivalry in Kentucky. The rivalry item is The Barrel, painted red with Manual's "M" on one side and purple with Male's "H" on the other.	
Vineland High School (Vineland, New Jersey)	Millville High School (Millville, New Jersey)	67–66–19	1893; 133 years ago	Annual Thanksgiving football game. The oldest rivalry football game in New Jersey. The game on Thanksgiving Day 2023 (November 23, 2023) was the 152nd matchup between the two teams.	
Saint Ignatius College Preparatory (San Francisco, California)	Sacred Heart Cathedral Preparatory (San Francisco, California)	41–19–2	1893; 133 years ago	The rivalry dates back to a rugby game on March 17, 1893; this led to the establishment of the Bruce–Mahoney Trophy in 1947. The trophy is named after a graduate from each school that died in World War II.	
West Aurora High School (Aurora, Illinois)	East Aurora High School (Aurora, Illinois)	66–48–12	1893; 133 years ago	The East–West rivalry dates back to November 18, 1893, and is the longest continuous rivalry in Illinois. The two schools met in all but two years (1894 and 1897) since 1893, including two games in 1896 and 1898, with all but a handful of games prior to 1953 taking place on Thanksgiving Day. West Aurora has won the last 18 meetings.	
Bradford Area High School (Bradford, Pennsylvania)	Olean High School (Olean, New York)		1893; 133 years ago	The second-oldest inter-state high school football rivalry in the country, and the oldest such rivalry to feature public schools.	
New Bedford High School (New Bedford, Massachusetts)	B.M.C. Durfee High School (Fall River, Massachusetts)	77–42–10	1893; 133 years ago	Annual Thanksgiving football game. The oldest high school football rivalry in South Coast New England. The 129th meeting was played in 2021.	
Pottsville Area High School (Pottsville, Pennsylvania)	Reading High School (Reading, Pennsylvania)	46–38–8	1893; 133 years ago	Annual Thanksgiving Day game from 1932–77. Cities separated by 34 miles via PA Route 61. In years past, teams, band and fans traveled to game via famed "Reading Railroad" and then paraded along host city streets to stadium.	
Gonzaga College High School (Washington, D.C.)	St. John's College High School (Washington, D.C.)	50–50–5 (through 2025)	1893; 133 years ago	The "Modern Era" began on October 26, 1928, when the teams met at Georgetown University before a crowd of 2,500. Between 1928 and 1978, a period of 51 years, the teams met each fall. Fifty-three times without interruption, including two playoff games.	
Mount Carmel High School (Mount Carmel, Pennsylvania)	Shamokin High School (Shamokin, Pennsylvania)	77–25–11	1893; 133 years ago	Following a six-year hiatus from 1928–1933, the two teams have played each other every year since 1934. The game known as the "Coal Bucket Game", formerly played on Thanksgiving Day, began in 1951 (series record: 51–15–2).	
Thornton Academy (Saco, Maine)	Biddeford High School (Biddeford, Maine)	49–34–8	1893; 133 years ago	The annual "Battle of the Bridge" rivalry began in 1893 and was played off and on until 1927. In 1954, there was a nine-year gap before resuming in 1963 and continuing since.	
Memphis University School (Memphis, Tennessee)	Christian Brothers High School (Memphis, Tennessee)	33–29–3	1894; 132 years ago	One of the most intense and historical high school rivalries in the state of Tennessee, beginning in 1894, making it the oldest in the state.	
Hebron Academy (Hebron, Maine)	Kents Hill School (Kents Hill, Maine)		1894; 132 years ago	Annual football game. One of the oldest high school rivalries in Maine.	
Athol High School (Athol, Massachusetts)	Ralph C. Mahar Regional High School (Orange, Massachusetts)	51–31–1	1894; 132 years ago	Annual football game. Thanksgiving Day Game. One of the oldest high school rivalries in Massachusetts.	
St. Johnsbury Academy (St. Johnsbury, Vermont)	Lyndon Institute (Lyndon, Vermont)	64–44–6	1894; 132 years ago	Annual football game. Played on the last Saturday of the regular season for Vermont high school football.	
Menominee High School (Menominee, Michigan)	Marinette High School (Marinette, Wisconsin)	52–50–7	1894; 132 years ago	The oldest interstate rivalry between two public high schools (third overall). Menominee and Marinette are "twin towns" separated by less than a mile of water and a bridge, making the rivalry all the more intense.	
Massillon Washington High School (Massillon, Ohio)	Canton McKinley High School (Canton, Ohio)	78–53–5 (through 2025)	1894; 132 years ago	Annual. The last game of the regular season at either Paul Brown Tiger Stadium in Massillon, or Tom Benson Hall of Fame Stadium, next to the Pro Football Hall of Fame, in Canton. This game gets listed on Vegas parlay sheets and has been featured in Sports Illustrated and in the 2017 documentary Timeless Rivals. Tied 2nd-oldest rivalry in Ohio and is tied for 2nd-most played.	
Shelby High School (Shelby, Ohio)	Galion High School (Galion, Ohio)	82–33–8 (through 2025)	1894; 132 years ago	Tied for Ohio's second-oldest rivalry and tied for the 7th most-played. No game from 1895-1899, 1908, 1910, 1912, 1913, 1916, 1917, and 2011–2018. Shelby won the only playoff match in the 2025 regional final.	
Lorain High School (Lorain, Ohio)	Elyria High School (Elyria, Ohio)	60–47–4 (through 2025)	1894; 132 years ago	Interrupted with the closure of Lorain High in 1994. Reformed in 2014 with consolidation of Lorain Admiral King and Southview, the new Lorain renewed the series with Elyria.	
Leominster High School (Leominster, Massachusetts)	Fitchburg High School (Fitchburg, Massachusetts)	69–61–10	1894; 132 years ago	Annual Thanksgiving football game. "The Rivalry", also known by locals as the Turkey Bowl, met for the 111th Thanksgiving and the 155th time overall in 2016. Since the 2004–05 football season, Leominster is currently 13–2 against Fitchburg. The only two losses are from the 2008 Thanksgiving Day game and the Division 2 Central MA playoff game in 2014.	
Newton North High School (Newton, Massachusetts)	Brookline High School (Brookline, Massachusetts)	55–53–6	1894; 132 years ago	Annual Thanksgiving football game.	
Ottawa Township High School (Ottawa, Illinois)	Streator Township High School (Streator, Illinois)	64–38–2	1894; 132 years ago	The Ottawa Pirates and Streator Bulldogs are the third-longest football rivalry in Illinois still ongoing. The first meeting was on November 3, 1894 with Streator winning 14–0. Ottawa won the September 5, 2025 game 50–14.	
Ansonia High School (Ansonia, Connecticut)	Naugatuck High School (Naugatuck, Connecticut)	74–37–10	1895; 131 years ago	Annual Thanksgiving football game. Teams compete for the Shorell–Lucas Trophy and the game regularly draws crowds of 10,000+. It is the second oldest football rivalry in Connecticut.	
Sandusky High School (Sandusky, Ohio)	Fremont Ross High School (Fremont, Ohio)	58–55–8 (through 2026)	1895; 131 years ago	Historic annual battle between the Little Giants and Blue Streaks in Ohio's third-oldest rivalry. Fremont Ross won 51–6 in 2026 to notch their sixth consecutive win over Sandusky.	
Barnstable High School (Hyannis, Massachusetts)	Falmouth High School (Falmouth, Massachusetts)	58–57–8	1895; 131 years ago	Annual football game. Traditionally played on Thanksgiving Day, series played on Cape Cod.	
Warwick Valley High School (Warwick, New York)	Goshen High School (Goshen, New York)	45–44–0 (since 1927)	1896; 130 years ago	Second-oldest rivalry in New York State; teams have played annually since 1927, and for the Spirit Trophy since 1976. In 2011, Goshen opted out of the rivalry due to divisional realignment. The series resumed in 2015.	
North Tonawanda High School (North Tonawanda, New York)	Tonawanda High School (Tonawanda, New York)	68–32–9	1896; 130 years ago	Annual T–NT game is the oldest rivalry in the Buffalo, NY area. While North Tonawanda has had a major advantage in recent years, Tonawanda snapped a long losing streak with a 27–0 win in 2019.	
Dover High School (Dover, Ohio)	New Philadelphia High School (New Philadelphia, Ohio)	60–53–9	1896; 130 years ago	Annual, last Friday in October. 9th most played and the 4th oldest rivalry in the state. These two teams had their 100th meeting game in 2004, which coincidentally found rivalry's record tied at 45–45–9.	
Adrian High School (Adrian, Michigan)	Monroe High School (Monroe, Michigan)		1896; 130 years ago	Annual game. Usually the last game of the season.	
Plainwell High School (Plainwell, Michigan)	Otsego High School (Otsego, Michigan)	70–44–6	1896; 130 years ago	Annual game, one of the longest in Michigan history	
Oil City Area High School (Oil City, Pennsylvania)	Franklin Area High School (Franklin, Pennsylvania)	70–60–12	1896; 130 years ago	aka "Route 8 Rivalry"; Teams have played every year since 1919 (DNP in 1918 due to flu epidemic); also DNP in 1904, 1905 and 1906	
Radnor High School (Radnor, Pennsylvania)	Lower Merion High School (Ardmore, Pennsylvania)	61–56–11	1897; 129 years ago	Annual football game; Radnor High School grants students a half-day on the following school day if the school beats Lower Merion. Radnor has won the last 11 years.	
Middletown High School (Middletown, New York)	Port Jervis High School (Port Jervis, New York)	69–55–7	1897; 129 years ago	Annual football game; played for the Erie Bell from a railroad linking the two Orange County, NY cities. Middletown won the most recent meeting 34–33.	
East Orange High School (East Orange, New Jersey)	Barringer High School (Newark, New Jersey)	63–39–9	1897; 129 years ago	Annual football game. Traditionally played on Thanksgiving Day. John Amos played in series, Dionne Warwick was a cheerleader in 1957.	
Lewiston High School (Lewiston, Maine)	Edward Little High School (Auburn, Maine)	93–70–12	1897; 129 years ago	The 175th Battle of the Bridge was won by Lewiston in 2017.	
Sandwich High School (Sandwich, Illinois)	Plano High School (Plano, Illinois)	58–52–4	1897; 129 years ago	The Sandwich Indians and Plano Reapers are one of the longest football rivalries in Illinois still active. In the 114th all-time meeting on September 12, 2025 Sandwich defeated Plano, 32-30.	
LaSalle-Peru High School (LaSalle, Illinois)	Ottawa Township High School (Ottawa, Illinois)	73–50–5	1897; 129 years ago	The Ottawa Pirates and LaSalle-Peru Cavaliers are one of the longest football rivalries in the State of Illinois still active. La Salle-Peru picked up 41-24 and 28-14 wins over Ottawa in 2025.	
Webster Groves High School (Webster Groves, Missouri)	Kirkwood High School (Kirkwood, Missouri)	58–51–7	1898; 128 years ago	Played on Thanksgiving Day in 1907 as the first championship game in St. Louis County. It is the oldest current Thanksgiving Day rivalry west of the Mississippi River.	
Bellevue High School (Bellevue, Ohio)	Norwalk High School (Norwalk, Ohio)	77-42-3	1898; 128 years ago	11th longest rivalry in Ohio.	
Galion High School (Galion, Ohio)	Bucyrus High School (Bucyrus, Ohio)	65-44-8	1898; 128 years ago	5th oldest rivalry in Ohio. Last played in 2019.	
Ironton High School (Ironton, Ohio)	Portsmouth High School (Portsmouth, Ohio)	67–61–8 (through 2025)	1899; 127 years ago	The first meeting was a scoreless tie on November 30, 1899, at modern-day Moulton's Field in Ironton. The 3rd most played and tied for 5th oldest rivalry in the state of Ohio. Between these two River City towns they are separated 28 miles apart from each other. They battle for the Tom Grashel Memorial Trophy. Ironton leads 3-2 in playoff meetings as of week 12 of 2025.	
Shenandoah Valley High School (Shenandoah, Pennsylvania)	Mahanoy Area High School (Mahanoy City, Pennsylvania)	57–39–6	1899; 127 years ago	"The Backyard Brawl" Played for the Damato/Szematowicz Trophy, named for WWII war heroes, 1st from each school killed in battle. Schools and towns separated via 4 miles along PA State Rt 54.	
Reading Memorial High School (Reading, Massachusetts)	Stoneham High School (Stoneham, Massachusetts)	61–24–8	1899; 127 years ago	Annual football game. Traditionally played on Thanksgiving Day. Has been played continuously since 1923.	
Troy High School (Troy, Ohio)	Piqua High School (Piqua, Ohio)	69–66–6 Troy leads through 2025	1899; 127 years ago	Annual football game. Most played rivalry in Ohio at tied for 6th oldest. The schools are only eight miles apart. The game has been played continuously since 1911 and has had 141 meetings.	
Troy High School (Troy, Ohio)	Sidney High School (Sidney, Ohio)	71-31-7 (through 2025)	1899; 127 years ago	26th most played rivalry in the state of Ohio.	
Piqua High School (Piqua, Ohio)	Sidney High School (Sidney, Ohio)	85-41-6 (through 2025)	1899; 127 years ago	4th most played and tied for 6th oldest rivalry in the state of Ohio.	
Piqua High School (Piqua, Ohio)	Greenville High School (Greenville, Ohio)	79-22-3 (through 2025)	1899; 127 years ago	35th most played rivalry in the state of Ohio.	
Sidney High School (Sidney, Ohio)	Greenville High School (Greenville, Ohio)	56-39-4 (through 2025)	1899; 127 years ago	35th most played rivalry in the state of Ohio.	
Sidney High School (Sidney, Ohio)	Bellefontaine High School (Bellefontaine, Ohio)	60-49-7 (through 2025)	1899; 127 years ago	16th most played and tied for 6th oldest rivalry in the state of Ohio.	
Carmi-White County High School (Carmi, Illinois)	Fairfield Community High School (Fairfield, Illinois)	60–41–6	1899; 127 years ago	Annual football game. Have played for the Rotary Wheel trophy since 2005 (Fairfield leads trophy series 4–2)	

== 1900s ==
Series leader	Series rival	Series record	Series began	Notes	References
Marlborough High School (Marlborough, Massachusetts)	Hudson High School (Hudson, Massachusetts)	60–44–5	1900; 126 years ago	Annual Thanksgiving football game. It is one of the oldest rivalries in Central Massachusetts. The games are played at either the Morgan Bowl in Hudson or Kelleher Field in Marlborough.	
Westfield High School (Westfield, New Jersey)	Plainfield High School (Plainfield, New Jersey)	63–45–7	1900; 126 years ago	Annual Thanksgiving football game. Celebrated 100th game in 2005. (Plainfield won 9–0). Westfield won 2019 version, 24–0	
Sherman High School (Sherman, Texas)	Denison High School (Denison, Texas)	68–48–8	1901; 125 years ago	The oldest high school football rivalry in Texas, known as the "Battle of the Ax" since 1949 when the ax trophy was donated by a local businessman. Played annually since 1931; played multiple times or skipped in some prior years.	
Upper Sandusky High School (Upper Sandusky, Ohio)	Bucyrus High School (Bucyrus, Ohio)	51-50-3 (through 2025)	1901; 125 years ago	37th most played rivalry in the state of Ohio. In 1999, Bucyrus held a 43-32-3 lead	
Zanesville High School (Zanesville, Ohio)	Newark High School (Newark, Ohio)	62–53–4 (through 2025)	1901; 125 years ago	8th most played rivalry in the state of Ohio. In 2006, Newark led series 49-47-4 before ZHS won 15 of 17.	
Coshocton High School (Coshocton, Ohio)	Cambridge High School (Cambridge, Ohio)	54–45–5 (through 2023)	1901; 125 years ago	Rivalry in Central Ohio. Not played in 1902-1909, 1914, 1915, 1918-23, 2020-2026. Cambridge won the 100th meeting in 2017, 21-14.	
Melrose High School (Melrose, Massachusetts)	Wakefield High School (Wakefield, Massachusetts)	51–38–6	1901; 125 years ago	Annual football game. Have played continuously since 1918. Have played on Thanksgiving since 1960.	
Woodberry Forest School (Woodberry Forest, Virginia)	Episcopal High School (Alexandria, Virginia)	58–52–9	1901; 125 years ago	Annual football game. "The Game" is the oldest high school rivalry in the South. In 2001, the hundredth game attracted more than 15,000 fans, a game which Woodberry Forest won 24–13. It is tradition for both schools to light bonfires before the game, with Woodberry's often surpassing 50 feet in height.	
Dunkirk High School (Dunkirk, New York)	Fredonia High School (Fredonia, New York)	66–56–11 (through 2026)	1901; 125 years ago	Annual game. One of the longest running rivalries in Western New York. Fredonia won the last meeting 29-7 in 2026. One of the most memorable games in the rivalry was played in 2014, when Fredonia won 50-48 after four overtime periods.	
Bellefontaine High School (Bellefontaine, Ohio)	Urbana High School (Urbana, Ohio)	59–46–4 (through 2025)	1901; 125 years ago	The 27th longest rivalry in Ohio.	
Pottsville High School (Pottsville, Pennsylvania)	Shamokin Area High School (Shamokin, Pennsylvania)	50–20–0	1901; 125 years ago	Anthracite "hard" Coal Region Eastern Pennsylvania Football clash. Schools separated by 27 miles via PA Route 901. The last meeting at Shamokin's Kemp Memorial Stadium on August 30, 2013 was won by Pottsville 41–13.	
Benedictine Military School (Savannah, Georgia)	Savannah High School (Savannah, Georgia)	51–47–8	1902; 124 years ago	The oldest high school football rivalry in the state of Georgia; it used to be played on Thanksgiving Day before 1960.	
Fremont Ross High School (Fremont, Ohio)	Findlay High School (Findlay, Ohio)	56–43–3 (through 2025)	1902; 124 years ago	The 42nd most-played rivalry in Ohio. Findlay won first game of series on October 17, 1902. Both teams are in the Northern Lakes League.	
Wooster High School (Wooster, Ohio)	Ashland High School (Ashland, Ohio)	57–48–4 (through 2025)	1902; 124 years ago	Rivalry in North Central Ohio. Ashland won the 100th meeting in 2016 by a score of 43-36 3OT.	
Logansport High School (Logansport, Indiana)	Peru High School (Peru, Indiana)	62–52–5	1902; 124 years ago	Longest continuous rivalry in the state of Indiana; the cities are only 16 miles apart. In 2016, the Baldini Trophy was introduced, in honor of Don Baldini who grew up in Peru and later became the winningest coach in Logansport history.	
Haddonfield Memorial High School (Haddonfield, New Jersey)	Haddon Heights High School (Haddon Heights, New Jersey)	65–43–6	1902; 124 years ago	One of the oldest continuous rivalries in southern New Jersey; the schools are only 4 miles apart. The 2 Colonial Conference rivals now play for the Mayor's Trophy. HMHS has won 19 of the 23 meetings played since 2000.	
Punahou, (Honolulu, Hawaii)	Kamehameha, (Honolulu, Hawaii)	99–90-6	1903; 123 years ago	Due to countless post-season match-ups, Punahou-Kamehameha have played against each other more than any other school in the United States (195 games).	
Peddie School (Hightstown, New Jersey)	Blair Academy (Blairstown, New Jersey)	58–50–5	1903; 123 years ago	One of the oldest rivalries in New Jersey, has met every year since 1902. Peddie leads Blair Academy.	
Dodge City High School, (Dodge City, Kansas)	Garden City High School, (Garden City, Kansas)	77–45–3	1903; 123 years ago	An annual game, nicknamed the "Hatchet Game," in which the winner receives a traveling trophy (a hatchet). The first Hatchet Game was played in 1938. It is the second-oldest rivalry game in Kansas.	
Wooster High School, (Wooster, Ohio)	Orrville High School, (Orrville, Ohio)	59–46–9 (through 2025)	1903; 123 years ago	Annual. The longest running rivalry in Wayne County, Ohio and 13th most-played in Ohio. Played annually since 1919 except for 1980 (conflict with state playoffs) and 2020 (cancelled due to COVID).	
Washington Court House High School, (Washington Court House, Ohio)	Hillsboro High School, (Hillsboro, Ohio)	70-28–2 (through 2025)	1903; 123 years ago	Annual. Played its 100th game in 2025, won by Washington, 43-21.	
Parkersburg High School (Parkersburg, West Virginia)	Marietta High School (Marietta, Ohio)	81–31–6	1903; 123 years ago	The Battle for the Mid-Ohio Valley has been waged between PHS (West Virginia) and MHS (Ohio) for over a century. Between 1994 and 2009 and after 2020 the game did not take place due to scheduling problems with the two schools.	
Geneva High School (Geneva, Ohio)	Conneaut High School (Conneaut, Ohio)	60–51–6 through 2025	1903; 123 years ago	The 15th longest rivalry in Ohio and 2nd oldest in Northeast Ohio. No game held from 2016-22 and halted after 2025 with Genevea on a 15-game win streak. Rivalry stood at Conneaut 49-37 in 1993. No game in 1905 and 1910.	
East Boston School (East Boston, Massachusetts)	South Boston High School (South Boston, Massachusetts)	45–42	1903; 123 years ago	One of the oldest rivalries in Massachusetts, has met every year since 1903, East Boston leads the rivalry 45–42.	
Shelton High School (Shelton, Connecticut)	Derby High School (Derby, Connecticut)	52–42–7	1904; 122 years ago	Annual Thanksgiving football game. It draws upwards of 10,000 people. The Derby/Shelton Rotary Club donates a competitive trophy that the winner of the game possesses for a year. Notable players from Shelton High School are Matt Gorlewski and Dan Orlovsky	
Defiance High School (Defiance, Ohio)	Van Wert High School (Van Wert, Ohio)	56–53–4	1904; 122 years ago	Annual 19th longest rivalry in Ohio.	
Salem High School (Salem, Ohio)	East Liverpool High School (East Liverpool, Ohio)	50–49–2 through 2025	1904; 122 years ago	Annual The 44th longest rivalry in Ohio. The two towns are located in eastern Ohio just 29 miles apart. Since 2014, the Salem Quakers have defeated the Potters 10 of 12 times.	
Round Valley High School (Eagar, Arizona)	St. Johns High School (St. Johns, Arizona)		1904; 122 years ago		
Natick High School (Natick, Massachusetts)	Framingham High School (Framingham, Massachusetts)	79–33–5	1904; 122 years ago	Annual Thanksgiving football game. Series has been played annually since 1904, with the exception of 1907-09.	
Bellaire High School (Bellaire, Ohio)	Martins Ferry High School (Martins Ferry, Ohio)	59–56–8 (through 2025)	1905; 121 years ago	Tied for 6th most-played rivalry in the state of Ohio. Both teams are in the top 10 in Ohio and top 100 in the nation in all-time wins with over 720 each. They play for the S.P.A.R.K.Y. trophy (since 1964) which stands for Sportsmanship, Participation, Achievement, Rivalry, Knowledge, and Youth.	
Washington Court House High School (Washington Court House, Ohio)	Greenfield McClain High School (Greenfield, Ohio)	73–35–2 (through 2025)	1905; 121 years ago	22nd longest rivalry in Ohio. Court House won the 100th meeting in 2015, 35–27.	
Newburgh Free Academy (Newburgh, New York)	Kingston High School (Kingston, New York)	56–51–5	1905; 121 years ago	Played annually since 1919. One of the oldest rivalries in New York state.	
La Junta High School (La Junta, Colorado)	Lamar High School (Lamar, Colorado)	55–47–1	1905; 121 years ago	One of the oldest rivalries in Colorado. The Savages and Tigers have recently played for a train whistle' dubbed the "Whistle Game". This tradition began in 2002.	
Green Bay East High School (Green Bay, Wisconsin)	Green Bay West High School (Green Bay, Wisconsin)	51–39–3	1905; 121 years ago	One of the oldest rivalries in Wisconsin. Early games occasionally had more fans than Green Bay Packers games, who used to play at City Stadium.	
Mount Carmel High School (Chicago)	St. Rita of Cascia High School (Chicago)	56–27–0	1905; 121 years ago	One of the oldest rivalries in the Chicago Catholic League. Both schools have graduated a number of notable NFL players including Dennis Lick and Donovan McNabb.	
Baylor School (Chattanooga, Tennessee)	The McCallie School (Chattanooga, Tennessee)	46–42–3 (2021)	1905; 121 years ago	The oldest and most heated rivalry in Tennessee. Called the "cross-river" rivalry because the two schools are separated by the Tennessee River. Both schools use this game as their "homecoming" game, and it regularly attracts up to 10,000 people.	
Wellsville High School (Wellsville, Ohio)	Toronto High School (Toronto, Ohio)	50–49–0 (through 2025)	1905; 121 years ago	Rivalry in Upper Ohio River Valley. The schools are 14 miles apart. The teams did not meet in 1906-08, 1910, 1912, 1914-20, 1922-23, 2020, 2021, 2023, 2024	
Easton Area High School (Easton, Pennsylvania)	Phillipsburg High School (Phillipsburg, New Jersey)	68–44–5	1905; 121 years ago	The schools are separated by a bridge that crosses the Delaware River. The 1988 game between the two schools was the first nationally televised high school football game. Begun in 1916, it's the oldest interstate Thanksgiving Day Game, played at Lafayette College.	
Lancaster High School (Lancaster, Ohio)	Newark High School (Newark, Ohio)	59-43-2 (through 2025)	1906; 120 years ago	Rivalry in Central Ohio. Not played in 1907-1915. In 1950, Newark held a 22-8-1 lead. From 1951-2025, Lancaster has gone 51-21.	
Dover High School (Dover, New Hampshire)	Spaulding High School (Rochester, New Hampshire)	70–48–8	1906; 120 years ago	The oldest and one of the fiercest rivalries in New Hampshire. The first game in 1906 was a 0–0 tie. The 2011 game was the first time that both teams have met in the playoffs with Dover winning 24–21 on a last second field goal in front of a crowd of almost 5,000.	
Douglas High School (Douglas, Arizona)	Bisbee High School (Bisbee, Arizona)	76—58—8	1906; 120 years ago	"The (Copper) Pick", a contest between the high schools of two mining towns in southeast Arizona.	
Pottsville High School (Pottsville, Pennsylvania)	Mount Carmel High School (Mount Carmel, Pennsylvania)	29–29–2	1906; 120 years ago	Anthracite "hard" Coal Region Eastern Pennsylvania Football clash. Schools separated by 18. Both schools are Top 50 winningest programs in the nation with Mt Carmel at #5 all-time and #1 in Pennsylvania.	
Aberdeen High School (Aberdeen, Washington)	Hoquiam High School (Hoquiam, Washington)	62–35–5	1906; 120 years ago	The oldest high school football rivalry in the state of Washington. It had been the longest running football rivalry in the state until 1996 when Hoquiam High School cancelled the final three weeks of the season due to drug and alcohol violations.	
Haynesville Senior High School (Haynesville, Louisiana)	Homer High School (Homer, Louisiana)	71–31–5	1907; 119 years ago	Annual game and oldest high school football rivalry in the state of Louisiana, known as the "Claiborne Parish Super Bowl."	
Auburn Senior High School (Auburn, Washington)	Kent-Meridian High School (Kent, Washington)	47–47–13	1908; 118 years ago	The second oldest high school football rivalry in Washington as well as the longest running rivalry. The winner of each year's game wins and displays the Taylor Trophy which was first presented by Dr. Owen Taylor in 1929.	
Springdale High School (Springdale, Arkansas)	Fayetteville High School (Fayetteville, Arkansas)	62–48–13	1908; 118 years ago	One of the oldest rivalries in the state of Arkansas. Both teams are the Bulldogs, and separated by only a few miles. Prior to 2005, Springdale only had one public high school, so it was hotly contested. Fans of each school would burn the others' initials into the other teams' field, or dump purple marshmallows all over the field, or let chickens into the other's campus.	
Sikeston High School (Sikeston, Missouri)	Charleston High School (Charleston, Missouri)	90–34–4	1908; 118 years ago	Separated by 12 miles, it is considered by some to be the oldest rivalry west of the Mississippi River in terms of number of games played. The game was played on Thanksgiving Day for 50 years until it was controversially moved in 1960.	
Palmyra High School, (Palmyra, New Jersey)	Burlington City High School, (Burlington, New Jersey)	56–47–12	1908; 118 years ago	Annual Thanksgiving game; one of the oldest rivalries in New Jersey and the Philadelphia metropolitan area.	
Stockton High School (Stockton, Illinois)	Galena High School (Galena, Illinois)	52–65–3	1908; 118 years ago	One of the oldest and most played rivalries in the state of Illinois. ref+	
Somerset High School, (Somerset, Kentucky)	Danville High School, (Danville, Kentucky)	43–13–2 (as of 2009)	1909; 117 years ago	Second longest running rivalry in Kentucky. Fights among fans and players lead to the series being halted from 1947–1957 and 1975–1984.	
Brookfield High School, (Brookfield, Missouri)	Marceline High School, (Marceline, Missouri)	39–36–1	1909; 117 years ago	Separated by 9 miles, this heated rivalry is one of the oldest in Missouri.	

== 1910s ==
Series leader	Series rival	Series record	Series began	Notes	References
Whitman-Hanson Regional High School, (Whitman, Massachusetts)	Abington High School, (Abington, Massachusetts)	53–38–5 (through 2010)	1910; 116 years ago	Has been an annual Thanksgiving Contest since 1910, only skipping 1912.	
Marblehead High School, (Marblehead, Massachusetts)	Swampscott High School, (Swampscott, Massachusetts)	55–49–6 (through 2020)	1910; 116 years ago	Has been an annual Thanksgiving Contest since 1910, only skipping 2020.	
Cuero High School (Cuero, Texas)	Yoakum High School (Yoakum, Texas)	70–33–6	1911; 115 years ago	The oldest small school rivalry in Texas. Cuero went undefeated for 42 consecutive years from 1969 to 2011.	
Ravenna High School (Ravenna, Ohio)	Theodore Roosevelt High School (Kent, Ohio)	54–54–3 (through 2025)	1911; 115 years ago	Ravenna and Kent have always been rival towns, but the high schools' rivalry is especially harsh. The schools have been completing for the millennium trophy (retired to Ravenna in 2009) since 1999. The two schools now compete for "Big R", a glass trophy that annually travels to the winning school. Roosevelt tied series record with win in 2025.	
Asheville School (Asheville, North Carolina)	Christ School (Arden, North Carolina)	50–36–4	1911; 115 years ago	Has been played annually since 1911. The Asheville School Blues have the winning record, with the Christ School Greenies having won the contest every year since 2011. The winner is awarded the Fayssoux-Arbogast trophy.	
Portland High School (Portland, Maine)	Deering High School (Portland, Maine)	54–36–7	1911; 115 years ago	Annual Thanksgiving football game played the week after the state football championship. This is the only annual Thanksgiving game in Maine.	
Mayfield High School, (Mayfield, Kentucky)	Paducah Tilghman High School, (Paducah, Kentucky)	49–46–9 (according to MHS) or 47–47–10 (according to PTHS)	1911; 115 years ago	Third-oldest rivalry in Kentucky. Oldest rivalry in western Kentucky. Played on Thanksgiving until state playoffs were adopted in 1959. The results of the first two games are disputed.	
Stonington High School (Stonington, Connecticut)	Westerly High School (Westerly, Rhode Island)	74–74-17	1911; 115 years ago	Annual Thanksgiving football game; teams used to play twice a year. In terms of games, no two high school football teams have played as many games against each other.	
El Campo High School (El Campo, Texas)	Bay City High School (Bay City, Texas)	55–43–8	1911; 115 years ago	The longest continual rivalry in Texas, the Ricebirds and Blackcats have played every year since 1920.	
Bluefield High School (Bluefield, West Virginia)	Graham High School (Bluefield, Virginia)	63–24–2	1911; 115 years ago	"The Battle of the Bluefields", played at Mitchell Stadium in West Virginia but serves as the home stadium for both schools. The rivalry resumed between Bluefield and Graham in 1928 and has been played continuously ever since.	
Texas High School, (Texarkana, Texas)	Arkansas High School, (Texarkana, Arkansas)		1912; 114 years ago	Long-standing rivalry between twin cities separated by a state line.	
Granville High School (Granville, Ohio)	Utica High School (Utica, Ohio)	64–24–4 (through 2024)	1912; 114 years ago	Rivalry in Central Ohio. Not played 1916, 1918-21, 2020-23. Renewed in 2024.	
Jackson High School (Jackson, Ohio)	Wellston High School (Ohio) (Wellston, Ohio)	74–27–5 (through 2024)	1913; 113 years ago	Rivalry in southeastern Ohio. Not played 1917, 1918, 1924. Discontinued after 2019. Jackson went 28-1 since 1990 and 44-4-1 since 1969. In 1968 the series stood at 30-23-4	
Danville High School (Danville, Ohio)	Centerburg High School (Centerburg, Ohio)	60–37–9 (through 2025)	1913; 113 years ago	31st longest rivalry in Ohio, and one of the oldest in Central Ohio.	
St. Marys High School (St. Marys, West Virginia)	Williamstown High School (Williamstown, West Virginia)	57–37–1 (through 2024)	1913; 113 years ago	Rivalry along the Ohio River between towns just 18.1 miles apart. Each team has had a 14-game win streak. Williamstown has gone 22-6 since 2000. After 1999 the record stood at 51-15-1 St. Marys. Williamstown has won all 3 playoff meetings including the 2014 WV Class A State Championship meeting, 33-32.	
Geneva High School, (Geneva, Illinois)	Batavia High School, (Batavia, Illinois)	51–49–5	1913; 113 years ago	A heated rivalry between two teams that are only separated by a border.	
Jackson High School, (Jackson, Missouri)	Cape Central High School, (Cape Girardeau, Missouri)	63–35–5	1913; 113 years ago	Jackson and Cape play only 11 miles from each other, separated only by class, with Jackson in 5A, and Cape in 4A. Both play in the SEMO North Conference against other rivals in Farmington, Sikeston and Poplar Bluff.	
Evanston Township High School, (Evanston, Illinois)	New Trier High School, (Winnetka, Illinois)	54–45–4	1913; 113 years ago		
Valdosta High School, (Valdosta, Georgia)	Colquitt County High School, (Moultrie, Georgia)	71–32–4 (October 2021)	1913; 113 years ago	The series began in 1913 and at that time the Colquitt County Packers were known as Moultrie High School. In 1978 the school continued the rivalry playing the Valdosta Wildcats as the Colquitt County Packers as they are known today. Valdosta has dominated the rivalry by a lopsided margin.	
Winthrop High School, (Winthrop, Massachusetts)	Revere High School, (Revere, Massachusetts)	58–32–3	1913; 113 years ago	Annual Thanksgiving football game between two neighboring cities just outside of Boston. The rivalry was not played from 1928-32 and 1947-58 due to brawls that occurred during the 1927 and 1945 games respectively, and in 2020 due to the COVID-19 pandemic. Notably, Winthrop won 32 of the 35 games played between 1975 and 2009.	
Gilman School (Baltimore)	McDonogh School (Owings Mills, Maryland)	61–41–5	1914; 112 years ago	Annual football game played in early November. It is the second-oldest interscholastic rivalry in the state of Maryland. The game was not played in 1916, 1918, or 2020.	
East Palestine High School (East Palestine, Ohio)	Columbiana High School (Columbiana, Ohio)	51–47–3 (through 2025)	1914; 112 years ago	One of the longest rivalries in eastern Ohio. East Palestine won the first 11 meetings, and from 1997-2025 Columbiana went 23-6.	
Logan High School (Logan, Ohio)	Athens High School (Athens, Ohio)	54–38–5 (through 2025)	1914; 112 years ago	One of the oldest rivalries in southern Ohio. From 1973-2025, Logan went 33-8-2.	
Fredericktown High School (Fredericktown, Ohio)	Danville High School (Danville, Ohio)	53–46-4 (through 2025)	1914; 112 years ago	One of the oldest rivalries in central Ohio.	
Gallia Academy High School (Gallipolis, Ohio)	Jackson High School (Jackson, Ohio)	49–46–7 (through 2025)	1914; 112 years ago	One of the oldest rivalries in southeastern Ohio. No game from 2019-2024.	
Granville High School (Granville, Ohio)	Johnstown High School (Johnstown, Ohio)	67–39–3 (through 2025)	1914; 112 years ago	Rivalry in Central Ohio. Not played in 1916, 1920, 1921, 1928, 1929, 1932.	
Napoleon High School (Napoleon, Ohio)	Bowling Green High School (Bowling Green, Ohio)	56–51–3 (through 2025)	1915; 111 years ago	The 23rd longest rivalry in Ohio. From 1975-2025, Napoleon went 33-16 in that span.	
Eufaula High School, (Eufaula, Oklahoma)	Checotah High School, (Checotah, Oklahoma)	54–53–1	1915; 111 years ago	Oldest uninterrupted rivalry game in Oklahoma. Series was tied before Eufaula won the 2023 game. Known as the McIntosh County War.	
Abington Senior High School, (Abington Township, Pennsylvania)	Cheltenham High School, (Wyncote, Pennsylvania)	54–34–6	1915; 111 years ago	The rivalry is between the senior high schools of neighboring Abington and Cheltenham townships. The two schools are less than two miles apart.	
Lisbon David Anderson High School (Lisbon, Ohio)	Leetonia High School (Leetonia, Ohio)	59-37–5 (through 2025)	1915; 111 years ago	One of the oldest rivalries in eastern Ohio.	
Gallia Academy High School (Gallipolis, Ohio)	Athens High School (The Plains, Ohio)	49–48–4 (through 2024)	1915; 111 years ago	One of the oldest rivalries in southeastern Ohio. In 1979 Athens led series 38-20-3. Since 1980, Gallia has gone 29-10-1. Series halted after 2024.	
McMinn County High School (Athens, Tennessee)	Bradley Central High School (Cleveland, Tennessee)	55–41–3	1916; 110 years ago	The teams have met every year since 1927, including twice in 1943 and in the playoffs in 2000 and 2012.	
Columbiana High School (Columbiana, Ohio)	Lisbon David Anderson High School (Lisbon, Ohio)	54-41-3 (through 2025)	1916; 110 years ago	Rivalry in the Upper Ohio River Valley. Not played in 1919, 1922, 1923, 1932-35, 1988-90, 2012.	
Napoleon High School (Napoleon, Ohio)	Defiance High School (Defiance, Ohio)	56-45–2 (through 2025)	1916; 110 years ago	Dubbed the "Maumee River Rivalry" because the two towns are located approximately 15 miles apart with both situated on the Maumee River.	
Hollywood High School (Hollywood, California)	Van Nuys High School (Van Nuys, California)		1916; 110 years ago	One of the oldest high school rivalries in Los Angeles. Both high schools have graduated a number of famous Hollywood celebrities, and NFL Hall-of-Famer Bob Waterfield was a VNHS alum.	
Thomasville High School (Thomasville, Alabama)	Clarke County High School (Grove Hill, Alabama)	61–30–8	1917; 109 years ago	Separated by 15 miles, the two compete in a three-way rivalry similar to the Army–Navy–Air Force rivalry.	
Jackson High School (Jackson, Alabama)	Clarke County High School (Grove Hill, Alabama)	63–29–8	1917; 109 years ago	Separated by 15 miles, the two compete in a three-way rivalry similar to the Army–Navy–Air Force rivalry.	
Jackson High School (Jackson, Ohio)	Logan High School (Logan, Ohio)	51-46-4 (through 2024)	1917; 109 years ago	One of the longest rivalries in Southeastern Ohio. From 2010-2024 Jackson went 12-1.	
Jesuit High School (New Orleans)	Holy Cross School (New Orleans)	59–40–1	1919; 107 years ago	Annual; fifth oldest Great American Rivalry series in the nation.	
Lancaster High School (Lancaster, New York)	Depew High School (Depew, New York)	48–32–6	1919; 107 years ago	The rivalry was ranked one of the top 15 in the nation by USA Today in 1993. While the two schools today vary greatly in student population, the games remain competitive.	
New Lexington High School (New Lexington, Ohio)	Crooksville High School (Crooksville, Ohio)	63–47–6 (through 2025)	1919; 107 years ago	Rivalry in Central Ohio within the Muskingum Valley League. From 2004-2025 New Lexington went 20-2.	
Tennessee High School (Bristol, VA)	Virginia High School (Bristol, TN)	72–28–2	1919; 107 years ago	This rivalry is unique as the two teams are not only cross-town rivals, but the city of Bristol is split between the states of Virginia and Tennessee.	
Hillsboro High School (Hillsboro, Ohio)	Greenfield McClain High School (Greenfield, Ohio)	54-50-2 (through 2025)	1919; 107 years ago	33rd longest rivalry in Ohio.	

== 1920s ==
Series leader	Series rival	Series record	Series began	Notes	References
Loyola Blakefield (Baltimore)	Calvert Hall College High School (Baltimore)	53–44–8	1920; 106 years ago	Annual Thanksgiving football game. The rivalry is one of the oldest between two Catholic high schools in the U.S.	
Gaffney High School (Gaffney, South Carolina)	Spartanburg High School (Spartanburg, South Carolina)	55–52–3	1920; 106 years ago	Separated by just 15 miles, this rivalry started as an annual Thanksgiving football game. Was played on Thanksgiving Day or Wednesday before Thanksgiving every year until 1950's. Played every year from 1920–1938. After a 5-year hiatus the teams played every year from 1944–2019, including sometimes 2 or 3 times a season, only missing 2020 due to COVID-19 Pandemic. Gaffney High School has won 19 of last 24 meetings, including nine straight since 2017.	
Albion High School (Albion, New York)	Medina High School (Medina, New York)	51–39–4	1920; 106 years ago	One of the oldest rivalries in Western New York. The last regular season game for both schools, thousands attend from each town located only ten miles apart.	
Milton High School (Milton, Massachusetts)	Braintree High School (Braintree, Massachusetts)	44–39–1	1920; 106 years ago	The rivalry on Thanksgiving began in 1920. The few records are missing between 1923–30 and there was no game in 1938 and 1940.	
Rockwood High School (Rockwood, Tennessee)	Harriman High School (Harriman, Tennessee)	61–36–6	1921; 105 years ago	Known as "Tennessee's Longest Running Football Rivalry", the teams have met every year since 1921 except 1923, including twice in 1921, 1922, and 1924.	
North Attleborough High School (North Attleborough, Massachusetts)	Attleboro High School (Attleboro, Massachusetts)	55–27–8	1921; 105 years ago	Eighty-nine of the 90 games have been played on the holiday, with one game played as a state divisional Super Bowl. North Attleborough has been dominant over the past 20 years, but the game has grown closer and is now a league game with Attleboro's recent membership in the Hockomock League.	
Shadyside High School (Shadyside, Ohio)	Bridgeport High School (Bridgeport, Ohio)	64-34-3 (through 2025)	1921; 105 years ago	Began in 1921, not played just 4 years since then. Played 1 playoff game. 2nd longest rivalry in Belmont County. 100th game played in 2024 won by Shadyside in biggest shootout of series, 40-34. Series stood at 40-31-3 after 1998. Bridgeport last had lead in 1974 at 24-23-3	
Watertown High School (Watertown, Massachusetts)	Belmont High School (Belmont, Massachusetts)	49–45–5	1921; 105 years ago	This rivalry has been back and forth over the last 89 years. The game in 1940 was cancelled due to snow. The centennial game in 2022 was played at Fenway Park, the home of the Boston Red Sox.	
Canisius High School (Buffalo, New York)	St. Joseph's Collegiate Institute (Kenmore, New York)	48–48–3	1921; 105 years ago	The series was suspended from 1932 and 1947 due to the vicious physicality of the games (a brawl even broke out after the 1931 game), but Bishop John Francis O'Hara, known for his role in helping to elevate the University of Notre Dame's football team to national notoriety, later required the rivalry to be reinstated when a Catholic league was formed. As the most anticipated and attended game in WNY and included as one of The Buffalo News' 100 Must-See Things in Buffalo, the attendance is always strong; the record currently stands at 28,009. Canisius has won 7 straight and 18 of the last 19 games.	
Haverford High School (Havertown, Pennsylvania)	Upper Darby High School (Upper Darby Township, Pennsylvania)	50–43–6	1921; 105 years ago	One of the oldest Thanksgiving Day rivalry games in Pennsylvania; the schools are just 2.5 miles apart.	
Hardee High School (Wauchula, Florida)	DeSoto County High School (Arcadia, Florida)	63–34–5	1921; 105 years ago	Oldest rivalry in the state of Florida.	
Evansville Reitz High School (Evansville, Indiana)	Evansville Central High School (Evansville, Indiana)	74–37–4	1921; 105 years ago	Oldest rivalry in the city of Evansville. The schools have played every year since 1921, occasionally twice in a year, and often draw crowds of 8,000–10,000.	
Jesuit High School (New Orleans)	Holy Cross School (New Orleans)	57–40–1 (not including a 1937 JHS win later ruled "no contest" by the LHSAA)	1922	JHS and HCS, both longtime members of the New Orleans-area "Catholic League" district of the LHSAA, compete annually in Louisiana's second-oldest high school football rivalry. It is also "the fifth oldest continuously played prep rivalry in the country." The most notable game in the series was for the 1963 3A state title; HCS won. Since 2006 the game has been played for the Golden Football. In 2008 the rivalry was recognized as a "Great American Rivalry Series." Through 2018, JHS holds a one-game winning streak.	
Oakdale High School (Oakdale, California)	Sonora High School (Sonora, California)	48–36–6	1922; 104 years ago	Single-high school rivals that always play the last game of the Valley Oak League season against each other, often drawing crowds of 10,000 or more. With Sonora dropping down to the Mother Lode League (Division 5) and Oakdale staying in the Valley Oak League (Division 3), it is unclear if this rivalry will continue. As for now, Oakdale and Sonora have decided to continue the annual rivalry as part of the teams' Week 1 preseason openers.	
St. Augustine High School (St. Augustine, Florida)	Palatka High School (Palatka, Florida)	46–42–3	1922; 104 years ago	There's no big trophy to be won in this rivalry, just a district title and good, old-fashioned hate. It is the second-oldest rivalry in Florida.	
Louisville High School (Louisville, Ohio)	North Canton Hoover High School (North Canton, Ohio)	58-42-5 (through 2025)	1922; 104 years ago	The 34th-most played rivalry in Ohio.	
Wapakoneta High School (Wapakoneta, Ohio)	Kenton High School (Kenton, Ohio)	52-42-5 (through 2025)	1922; 104 years ago	The 34th-most played rivalry in Ohio.	
Pen Argyl Area High School (Pen Argyl, Pennsylvania)	Bangor Area High School (Bangor, Pennsylvania)	50–44–4	1922; 104 years ago	First meeting was on Armistice Day in 1922. The teams play for the Slate Belt Trophy, a trophy featuring a large piece of slate (The region that these schools are located in once featured many slate quarries). Formerly a Thanksgiving Day rivalry, they haven't played on Thanksgiving since the mid 1970s. It is now the regular season finale for both teams.	
Tenafly High School (Tenafly, New Jersey)	Dumont High School (Dumont, New Jersey)	56–36–3	1922; 104 years ago	With 95 overall meetings, this is the oldest and most played high school football rivalry in Bergen County, New Jersey. Historically Tenafly has controlled the series, but Dumont has won 11 consecutive meetings. Dumont won the 2025 Thanksgiving Day "Turkey Bowl" by a score of 28-20. The rivalry is a long-standing one, played nearly every year since 1922 and played annually on Thanksgiving Day since 1949 with the exception of 2020.	
St. Mary's Memorial High School (St. Mary's, Ohio)	Celina High School (Celina, Ohio)	71-30-6 (through 2025)	1923; 103 years ago	Tied for the 30th-most played rivalry in Ohio.	
Doylestown Chippewa High School (Doylestown, Ohio)	Rittman High School (Rittman, Ohio)	59–57–7 (through 2025)	1923; 103 years ago	Tied for the 7th-most played rivalry in Ohio. From 1923-56 they played twice each season.	
Cincinnati Elder High School (Cincinnati, Ohio)	Cincinnati St. Xavier High School (Cincinnati, Ohio)	56–48–6 (through 2025)	1923; 103 years ago	Tied for the 22nd-most played rivalry in Ohio.	
Easley High School (Easley, South Carolina)	Pickens High School (Pickens, South Carolina)	36–19–1	1923; 103 years ago	The annual Sam Wyche Food Fight Bowl pits the Easley Green Wave against the Pickens Blue Flame in a game that attracts around 11,000 fans. The schools compete for two trophies: the "Ultimate Food Fight Trophy" goes to the school who raises the most money for the Pickens County Meals-on-Wheels program, and the "Food Fight Bowl Trophy" goes to the team that wins the football game.	
Dalton High School (Dalton, Ohio)	Rittman High School (Rittman, Ohio)	69–39–2 (through 2025)	1924; 102 years ago	Tied for the 22nd-most played rivalry in Ohio. They played twice from 1924-1950s.	
Santa Paula High School (Santa Paula, California)	Fillmore High School (Fillmore, California)	61-40-7	1924; 102 years ago	The two schools have played each other 108 times, including playoff games. No games were played in 1942 because of WWII, 1969 due to flooding, and 2019 due to the Maria Fire. The schools compete each year for leather helmet that was once used during rivalry games, now used as a trophy in a glass case. The winning school get to keep the helmet till the next rivalry game the following year. The schools take turns hosting the game, with home field switching each year. It is the oldest rivalry in Ventura County. Both Fillmore and Santa Paula compete in the Citrus Coast League of the CIF Southern Section.	
Concord High School (Concord, North Carolina)	A. L. Brown High School (Kannapolis, North Carolina)	42-38-4	1924; 102 years ago	Dubbed the "Battle for the Bell," the two high schools face off for bragging rights and a coveted 1940s Southern Railway Bell, donated to promote sportsmanship in the series for the 1950 game. The Bell is painted in transom of the winner's colors, a tribute to the textile heritage of Kannapolis and Concord.	
Dalton High School (Dalton, Ohio)	Doylestown Chippewa High School (Doylestown, Ohio)	68–49–5 (through 2025)	1925; 101 years ago	The 10th-most played rivalry in Ohio. From 1925-56 these two played twice each year.	
Portsmouth Notre Dame High School (Portsmouth, Ohio)	Portsmouth East/Sciotoville East High School (Sciotoville, Ohio)	60–39–4 (through 2025)	1925; 101 years ago	Between Portsmouth's Catholic school and Sciotoville (former Portsmouth East). Notre Dame won 19 straight from 1964-82 and 25 of 26. The rivalry stood at 20-18-4 for Notre Dame after 1963.	
Chelmsford High School (North Chelmsford, Massachusetts)	Billerica Memorial High School (Billerica, Massachusetts)	62–28–5 (through 2025)	1927; 99 years ago	The teams have met annually on Thanksgiving since 1927, with the exception of 1933, 1934, 1940, and 2020.	

== See also ==
- List of high school football rivalries less than 100 years old
