= The Old Rivalry =

- Sport: Football
- Teams: Male Bulldogs; Manual Crimsons
- First meeting: 1893; Male 14, Manual 12
- Latest meeting: October 31, 2025; Male 13, Manual 52
- Next meeting: TBA
- Trophy: The Barrel

Statistics
- Total meetings: 143
- All-time series: Male leads 90–47-6

The Old Rivalry, also known as Male-Manual or Manual-Male, is an annual football game between Louisville Male High School and DuPont Manual High School in Louisville, Kentucky. It is one of the oldest high school football rivalries in the United States. Male currently leads the rivalry in total wins. It is the oldest high school football rivalry in the state of Kentucky. The Rivalry is taken extremely seriously by both schools, as both of them consider the game to be one of the biggest events of the school year. The winner is given the Barrel to display at their school. The current holder of the barrel is Dupont Manual High School.
