= Rodney Wallace =

Rodney or Rod Wallace may refer to:

- Rodney Wallace (politician) (1823–1903), U.S. Representative from Massachusetts
- Rodney Wallace (fighter) (born 1981), American professional mixed martial arts fighter
- Rodney Wallace (footballer) (born 1988), Costa Rican association footballer
- Rodney Wallace (American football) (1949–2013), American football offensive lineman
- Rod Wallace (born 1969), retired English footballer

== See also ==
- Wallace (surname)
