= Eugene H. Lehman =

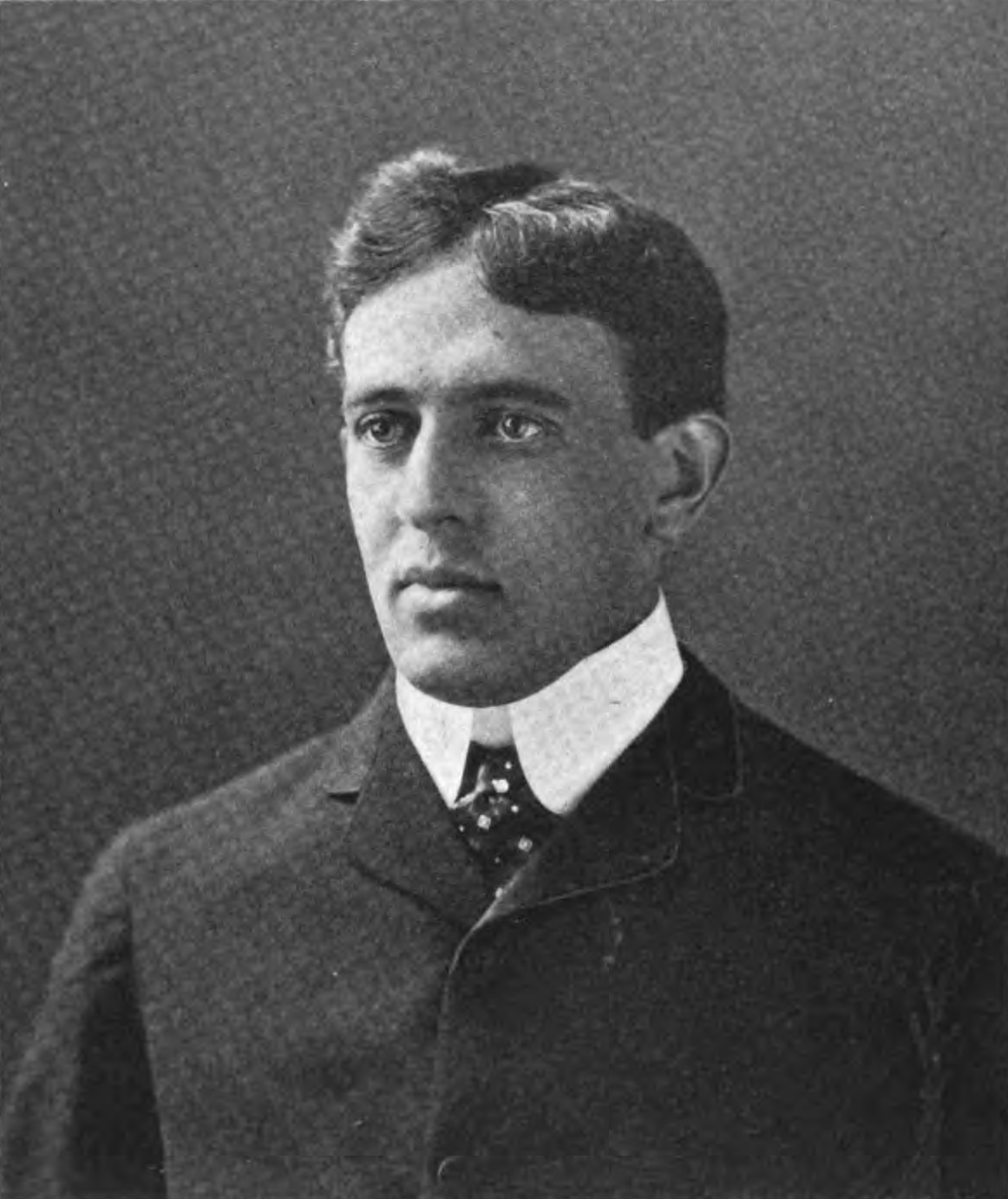
Eugene H. Lehman, c. 1902

Eugene Heitler Lehman (September 5, 1878/79 – August 21, 1972) was an American educator, author, and politician. He was the first American recipient of the Cecil Rhodes Scholarship, founder of the Highland Nature Camps, a mayor of Tarrytown, New York, and the first president of Monmouth College upon its status as a four-year university. Lehman was born in Pueblo, Colorado, to Jewish immigrants. He graduated from Pueblo's Centennial High School before attending Yale University, graduating in 1902. He taught English literature at the Jewish Theological Seminary in New York City and Biblical literature at Yale.
