= Bubba McCollum =

American football player (1952–2005)

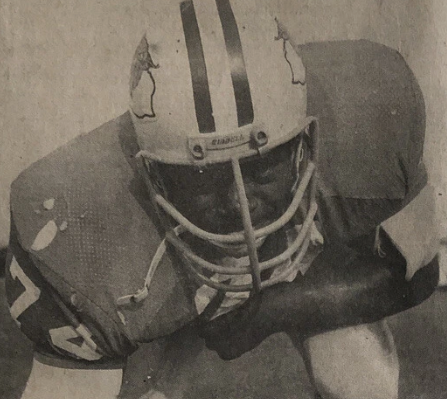
- McCollum in 1973

No. 70
- Position: Defensive tackle

Personal information
- Born: September 13, 1952; Louisville, Kentucky, U.S.
- Died: September 5, 2005 (aged 52); Lexington, Kentucky, U.S.

Career information
- High school: Louisville
- College: Kentucky (1970–1973)

Career history
- Houston Oilers (1974); Ottawa Rough Riders (1975)
- Stats at Pro Football Reference

James Henry McCollum (September 13, 1952 – September 5, 2005) was an American professional football defensive tackle. He played for the Houston Oilers of the National Football League (NFL), and played for the Ottawa Rough Riders of the Canadian Football League (CFL).

== Life and career ==
McCollum was born in Louisville, Kentucky, the son of Willie and Dorothy McCollum. He played high school football as a tackle at Louisville Male High School. He then enrolled at the University of Kentucky to play college football for the Kentucky Wildcats. He was on the freshman team in 1970, and was a three-year varsity letterman from 1971 to 1973. In 1973, he was named "the most valuable player" by the university, and in 1974, he was named the All-Southeastern Conference football middle guard.

In February 1974, McCollum was selected by the Florida Blazers of the National Football League (NFL) in the 15th round of the 1974 NFL draft. He joined the Houston Oilers. He started one game for the team, and played in eleven games during the 1974 NFL season, but was released from the team in September 1975. He then joined the Ottawa Rough Riders of the Canadian Football League (CFL). He played in one game during the 1975 CFL season. After his football career ended, he worked as a social worker at LaGrange, and was an assistant football coach at South Oldham High School in Crestwood, Kentucky. He was also a volunteer track coach at Eastern High School.

In 2000, McCollum was inducted into the Louisville Male High School Hall of Fame.

== Personal life and death ==
McCollum was married to Frances Wilson. They had two children. Their marriage lasted until McCollum's death in 2005.

McCollum died on September 5, 2005, in Lexington, Kentucky, at the age of 52.
