= Camp Mataponi =

All-girls sleepaway camp in Naples, Maine, US

- Interactive map of Camp Mataponi
- Location: Naples, Maine, United States
- Coordinates: 44°1′40″N 70°31′40″W
- Type: Drive In

Camp Mataponi (formerly known as Highland Nature Camps) is a non-sectarian, traditional all-girls sleepaway camp in Naples, Maine, United States, for girls approximately 7 to 15 years old. The camp is situated on Sebago Lake and accounts for over 5,000 feet of lakefront property. Camp Mataponi has grown to accommodate about 350 campers. Originally, the camp was called Highland Nature Camps. In the 1940s, it was renamed to Camp Mataponi. The name Mataponi is of the Virginia Native American Tribe, historically located near the Mata, Po, and Ni Rivers.

It was founded in 1910 by Eugene Lehman, his wife Madeleine Davidsburg Lehman, and Estelle B. Davidsburg as Highland Nature Camps. Mostly visited by distinguished families from New York City, it was a nonsectarian all-girls summer camp. In 1926, the camp had rifle shooting as an activity. In 1935, the camp ran between mid-June and September. To allow campers to both do sports and learn scholarly subjects, the affiliated Highland Manor School ran classes.

The current directors of the camp are Marcy and Dan Isdaner.

Some activities at Camp Mataponi include: water sports, high ropes, baseball, archery, boating, and water trampoline. Business Insider in 2012 included Camp Mataponi on an "Absurdly Expensive Summer Camps" list, noting that students had to pay $10,400. Business Insider said the camp's lunch salad bar has 30 choices, and it hosted themed barbecues every week with names like "Under the Sea", "Funky Princess Super Hero", "Western night", and “Barbie”.

In September 2023, the camp opened up its doors to the 8th grade class of Shore Country Day School, located in Beverly, Massachusetts. Students arrived before lunch on Wednesday, September 6, and left shortly after lunch on Friday, September 8. The 39 students indulged in many fun activities, slept in bunks, and bonded with classmates and teachers during their short stay at camp Mataponi.
