= Robert M. Stillman =

United States Air Force general

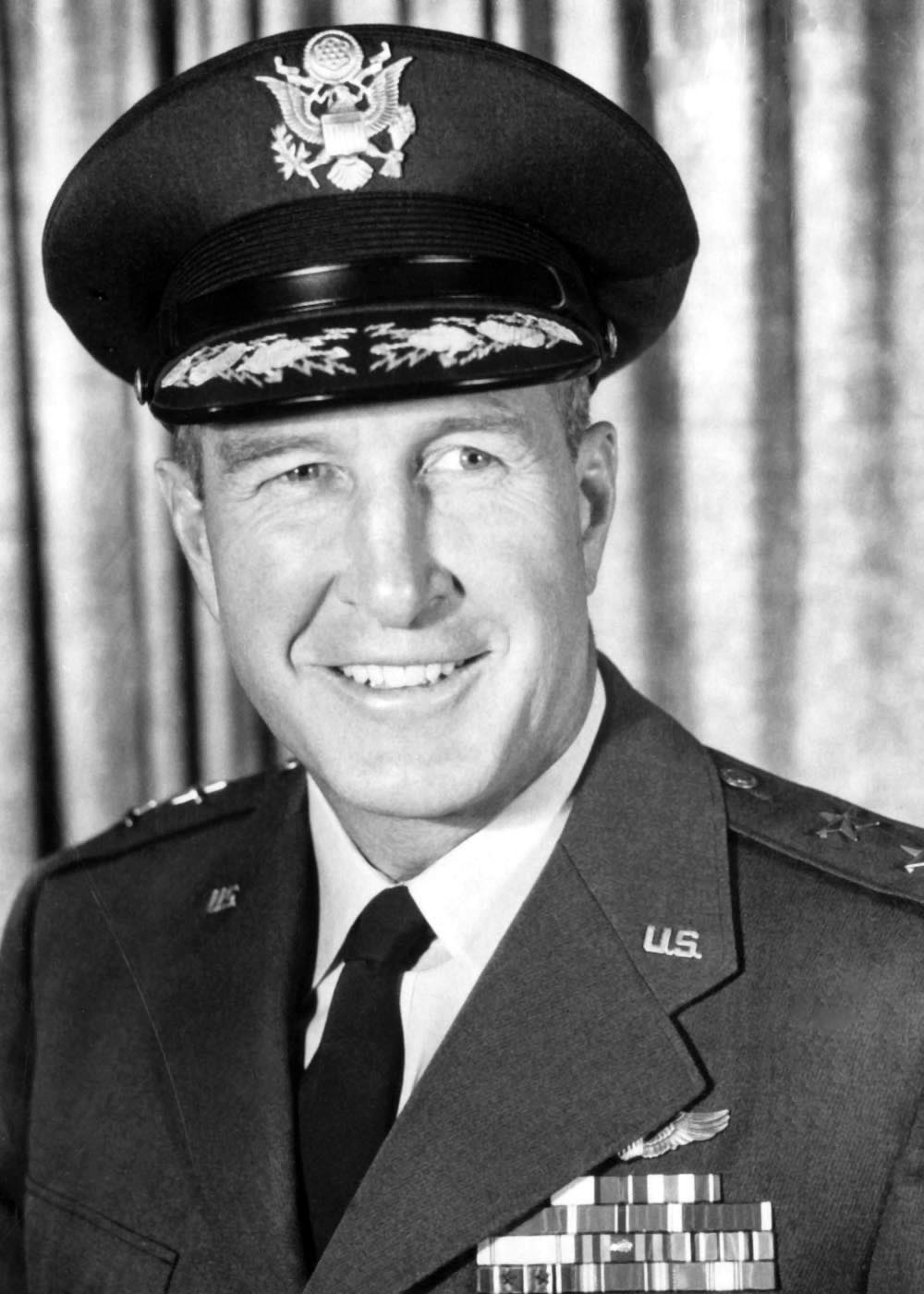
- Robert Morris Stillman
- Born: Robert Morris Stillman; November 30, 1911; Greenville, Ohio
- Died: May 22, 1991 (aged 79)
- Military career
- Allegiance: United States of America
- Branch: United States Army Air Corps; United States Army Air Forces; United States Air Force
- Service years: 1935–1965
- Rank: Major general
- Nickname: Moose
- Conflicts: World War II
- Awards: Distinguished Service Medal; Silver Star; Legion of Merit; Bronze Star; Purple Heart

Robert M. Stillman (November 30, 1911 – May 22, 1991) was a major general in the United States Air Force.

== Biography ==
Stillman was born Robert Morris Stillman in Greenville, Ohio, on November 30, 1911. He graduated from Central High School in Pueblo, Colorado, in 1929, where he was a member of the football team, and attended Colorado College. Stillman was also a member of the football team at Colorado College, attending the school on a football scholarship. He died on May 22, 1991.

== Military career ==
Stillman graduated from the United States Military Academy in 1935. From there, he began flight training at Randolph Field and Kelly Field. After completing his training, he joined the 50th Reconnaissance Squadron. During this time, Stillman returned to the Military Academy each year to serve as an assistant coach with the Army Black Knights football team.

Later, Stillman was transferred to Bolling Field. He was then assigned to the headquarters of the United States Army Air Forces and later to the 387th Bombardment Group.

In 1943, Stillman was deployed to serve in World War II. He assumed command of the 322d Bombardment Group of the Eighth Air Force in England. Later that year, he was shot down and captured during a low-level bombing mission over the Netherlands. He remained a prisoner of war for nearly two years at Stalag Luft III.

After his release, Stillman was placed in charge of training with the Third Air Force. Later, he was named Deputy Chief of Staff of Tactical Air Command.

From 1947 to 1949, Stillman was in command of Stewart Field. During this time, he became a member of the newly created U.S. Air Force. In 1949, Stillman became Deputy for Operations of the First Air Force. The following year, he graduated from the National War College and was assigned to the headquarters of the Air Force.

In 1954, Stillman became the first Commandant of Cadets at the United States Air Force Academy. He remained in this position until 1958 when he assumed command of Lackland Military Training Center. In 1959, Sports Illustrated named Stillman to its Silver Anniversary All-American football team. The list was made up of individuals who had achieved outstanding success following their athletic careers.

Stillman assumed command of the 313th Air Division in 1961 and of the Sheppard Technical Training Center at Sheppard Air Force Base in 1963. His retirement was effective as of August 1, 1965.

Awards he received during his career include the Distinguished Service Medal, the Silver Star, the Legion of Merit, the Bronze Star Medal and the Purple Heart.
