= Rodney Wallace (American football) =

American football player (1949–2013)

No. 71
- Position: Tackle / Guard

Personal information
- Born: February 10, 1949; Pueblo, Colorado, U.S.
- Died: July 21, 2013 (aged 64); Centennial, Colorado, U.S.
- Listed height: 6 ft 5 in (1.96 m)
- Listed weight: 255 lb (116 kg)

Career information
- High school: Central (CO)
- College: New Mexico
- NFL draft: 1971: 10th round, 259th overall pick

Career history
- Dallas Cowboys (1971–1974)

Awards and highlights
- Super Bowl champion (VI); Second-team All-WAC (1970)

Career NFL statistics
- Games played: 37
- Games started: 4
- Stats at Pro Football Reference

Rodney Allan Wallace (February 10, 1949 – July 21, 2013) was a professional American football offensive lineman in the National Football League (NFL) for the Dallas Cowboys. He played college football at the University of New Mexico.

== Early life ==
Wallace attended Central High School, where he developed into a three-sport athlete (football, basketball and track). In football, he was a starter at nose guard, while contributing to the 1965 Class AAA state championship that beat Poudre High School 14-0. As a senior, he received All-state honors in football and basketball.

He accepted a football scholarship from the University of New Mexico, where he became a starter at defensive tackle. As a senior, he was named one of the team's captains. He received Western Athletic Conference Player of the Week honors after posting 10 tackles, 3 passes defensed and one forced fumble against the University of Utah.

== Professional career ==
Wallace was selected by the Dallas Cowboys in the tenth round (259th) of the 1971 NFL draft. As a rookie, he was switched from the defensive to the offensive line, becoming a member of the Super Bowl VI winning team under coach Tom Landry.

He was mainly a backup that rotated from offensive tackle to offensive guard throughout his professional career. In 1972, he left abruptly during training camp after reporting 36 pounds overweight, stating that he was considering retirement, but went on to have a change of heart and returned to make the final roster.

The next year, he suffered a back injury and was placed on the injured reserve list, but was able to return to play in 12 games. In 1974, he underwent spinal surgery. He was released on September 14, 1975.

== Personal life ==
After football, he worked in pharmaceutical sales. He died on July 21, 2013. His wife was Coralie Wallace.
