= Centennial High School (Pueblo, Colorado) =

Location
- 2525 Mountview Drive; Pueblo, Colorado 81008; United States
- Coordinates: 38°18′16″N 104°38′16″W

Information
- School type: Public high school
- Established: 1873; 153 years ago
- School district: Pueblo 60
- CEEB code: 061190
- NCES School ID: 080612001035
- Principal: Alex Trujllo
- Teaching staff: 49.85 (on an FTE basis)
- Grades: 9–12
- Gender: Coeducational
- Enrollment: 824 (2023–24)
- Student to teacher ratio: 16.53
- Colors: Red and white
- Athletics conference: CHSAA
- Mascot: Bulldog
- Rival: Central High School
- Feeder schools: Heaton Middle School; Risley School of Exploration
- Website: centennial.pueblod60.org
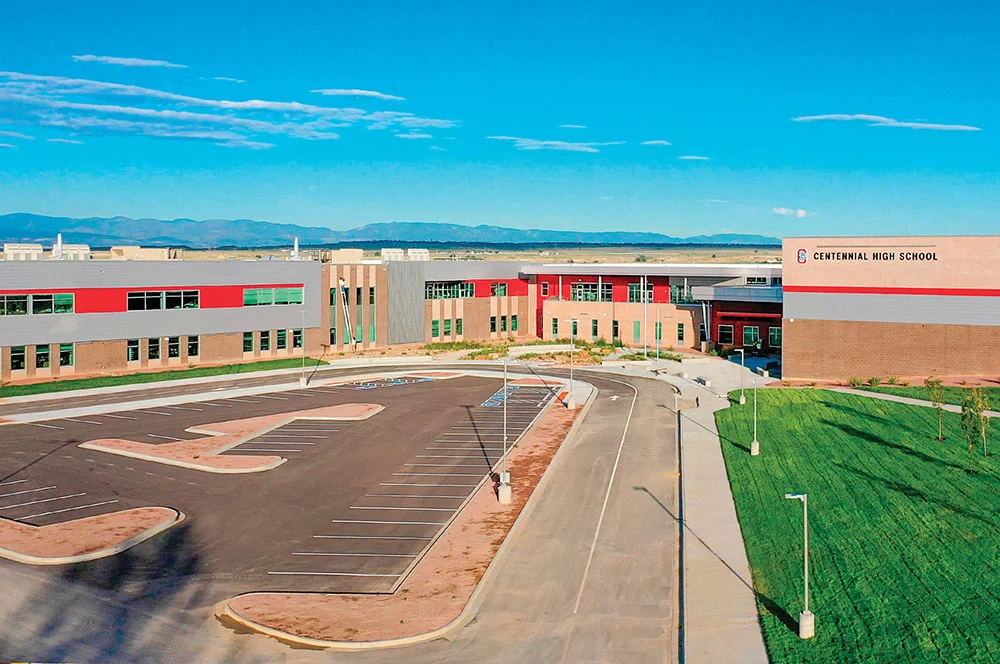

Centennial High School is a high school located in Pueblo, Colorado, United States. It serves roughly 1000 students in grades 9 through 12. The school is a part of Pueblo School District 60.

== History ==
Centennial High School started out as a 16 x 20 foot structure built in 1873 at 421 North Santa Fe Avenue in what became downtown Pueblo. Six years later, a larger adobe building went up at Eleventh and Court Streets on Pueblo's north side. This school was first called the High School of District One, or Pueblo High School. When Colorado was admitted to the Union in 1876, one hundred years after the signing of the Declaration of Independence, the high school gradually began to be called "The Centennial," in honor of Colorado's appellation as "The Centennial State." At some point, locals dropped the article and began referring to the school as Centennial High School.

The adobe building was expanded beginning in the late 1880s, until a larger high school was mostly in place by 1921. This building served for over fifty years until a new campus was built further north at Mountview Drive and Baltimore Avenue in 1973. The new campus featured a large gymnasium, an indoor natatorium with balcony seating, and District 60's only planetarium. The old campus was torn down is now the site of a District 60 administration building. A museum featuring a recreation of the font facade from the original building was built on campus, and it houses archival material detailing the history of the school and serves as the headquarters for the Centennial's alumni organization.

The first graduating class in 1884 consisted of seven students. Well-known graduates of Centennial include David Packard (1930), co-founder of the Hewlett-Packard Company; Morey Bernstein (1937), author of The Search for Bridey Murphy; Edra Jean "E.J." Peaker (1958), a Broadway, film, and television actress; and many of the business and political elite of Pueblo.

The school colors are red and white, which is believed to date back to 1894 when a group of the school's girls wore red and white ribbons in their hair for a football game against Colorado College. The school's mascot, the bulldog, gained school-wide acceptance around 1912. Centennial uses a variation of the University of Wisconsin fight song, which is sung as "On Centennial," for the school's fight song. Centennial won the first recognized Colorado state high school football championship in 1904, and has won three other state football championships since then, as well as championships in cross-country (seven) and basketball, golf, tennis, and cheerleading (one each).

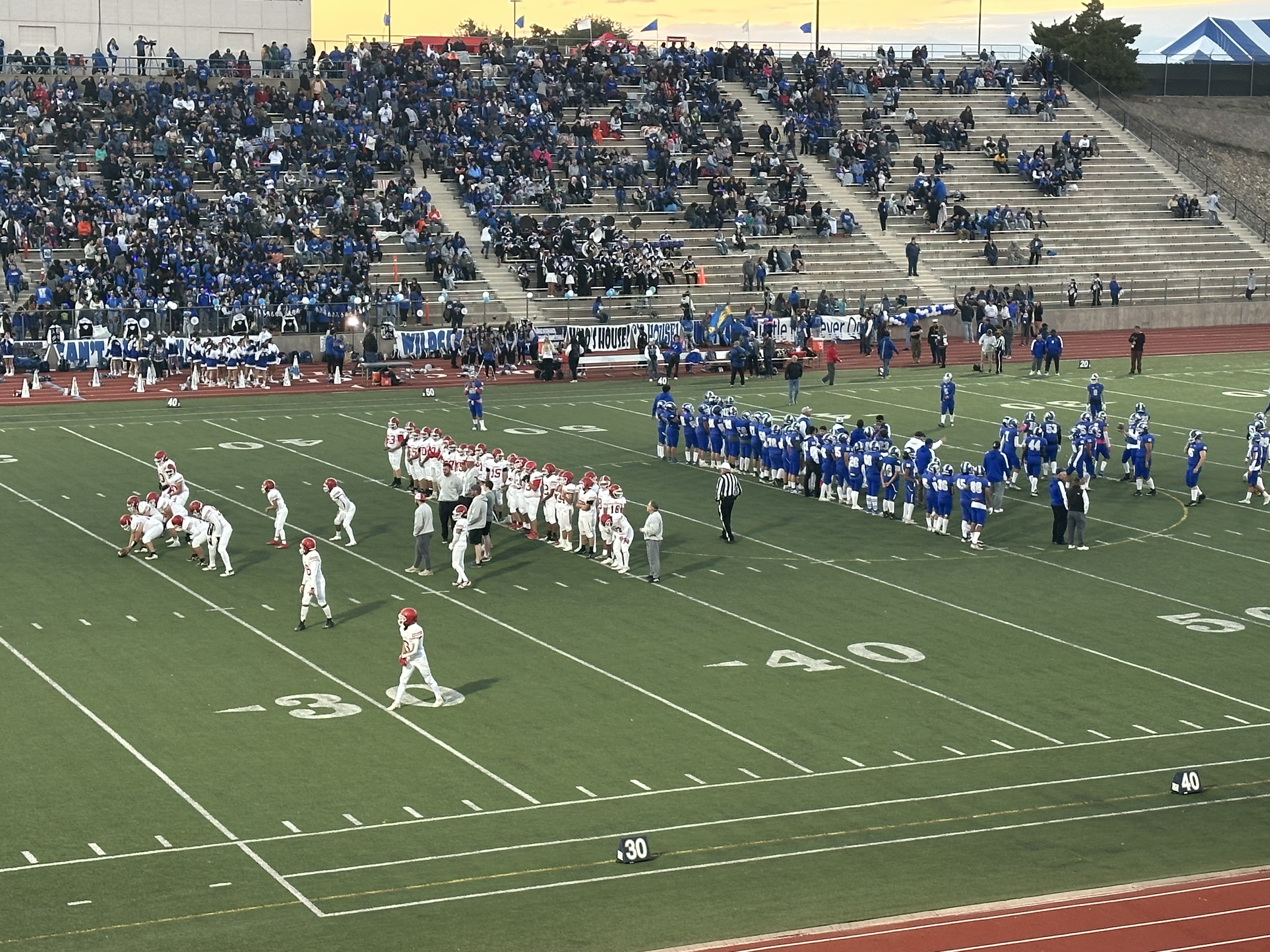
The Bell Game in 2023. The Centennial Bulldogs are on the left.

Centennial is part of what is believed to be the sixth oldest high school football rivalry, and the oldest west of the Mississippi River, with their annual game against cross-town rival Central High School. The schools first played in 1892 and played fairly regularly thereafter until 1907 when a brawl at that year's game and then JROTC training during World War I put a temporary halt to the series. Since resumption of the series in 1921 the teams have met every year. The game is known in Pueblo as "the Bell Game" and the winning school takes possession of an old train bell which was donated as a trophy in 1950. In 1973 the school moved from the old building downtown to a new building on the northern end of the city.

Construction of a new more modern building began in Spring 2021 and ended in May 2023, the old building was demolished, and new fields were constructed in the site of the 1973 building.

== Notable alumni ==
- Hatfield Chilson, former United States Federal Judge
- John Davis, former MLB player (Kansas City Royals, Chicago White Sox, San Diego Padres)
- Drew Dennis Dix, Medal of Honor Recipient for heroism in the Vietnam War
- Eugene H. Lehman, educator, former mayor of Tarrytown, New York
- David Packard, founder of Hewlett Packard
- Lise Simms, actress
