= Bell Game =

Annual American football contest

The Bell Game
- Teams: Centennial Bulldogs; Central Wildcats
- First meeting: 1892; Central 4, Centennial 0
- Latest meeting: September 11, 2026; Central 43, Centennial 0
- Next meeting: 2027
- Stadiums: Dutch Clark Stadium; Pueblo, CO

Statistics
- Total meetings: 126
- All-time series: Central leads, 64-53–9
- Largest victory: Central, 74–0 (1898)
- Current win streak: Central, 8 (2019–present)

The Bell Game is an annual football contest between two high schools in Pueblo, Colorado, USA: Centennial High School and Central High School. They have been playing each other since Thanksgiving Day 1892 in what is believed to be the oldest ongoing American football rivalry for high school teams west of the Mississippi River and the highest annual attendance for a high school sports event in Colorado, typically drawing 15,000 fans to Pueblo's Dutch Clark Stadium. The rivalry is sometimes referred to as the "One Hundred Year War". Since 1950, the teams have played for ownership of a railroad bell mounted upon a wheeled cart, along with the right to paint the cart the winning school's colors and keep the bell in the winning school for sporting events and school activities. In years where the bell is transferred from one school to the other, the senior cheerleaders from the losing school wheel the bell to midfield at the conclusion of the game where it is handed over to the senior cheerleaders and players from the victorious school. The bell's cart is repainted in the winning school's colors, with one small area retaining the color from the other school to symbolize the rivalry. There are also bell games in California (Linked Above), and in Virginia between Justice High School and Falls Church High School

Year	Winner	Score	Notes
1892	Central	4-0	
1893	Centennial	4-0	
1897	Centennial	16-0	
1898	Central	74-0	Central would go on to win an unofficial Colorado state championship.
1900	Centennial	30-0	
1900	Centennial	11-0	
1903	Centennial	10-0	
1904	Centennial	70-0	Centennial would go on to win the first official Colorado state championship.
1905	Centennial	11-0	
1906	Central	4-0	
1907	Tie Game	6-6	
1921	Central	13-0	
1922	Central	9-0	
1923	Centennial	5-0	
1924	Central	22-13	
1925	Central	43-0	Future Pro Football Hall of Fame member Earl "Dutch" Clark played his senior year at Central.
1926	Central	6-3	
1927	Central	13-6	
1928	Central	21-0	Central would go on to win Colorado state championship.
1929	Centennial	12-0	Future Hewlett-Packard founder David Packard played his senior year at Centennial.
1930	Central	20-0	
1931	Central	24-6	Central would end up Colorado state runner-up.
1932	Tie Game	0-0	
1932	Centennial	27-0	
1933	Centennial	26-13	
1933	Centennial	12-6	
1934	Centennial	26-2	
1934	Centennial	7-6	
1935	Central	21-6	
1935	Central	13-0	
1936	Tie Game	0-0	
1936	Tie Game	0-0	
1937	Tie Game	7-7	
1938	Central	13-7	Central would go on to win Colorado class A state championship.
1939	Centennial	20-13	Centennial would end up Colorado class A runner-up.
1940	Centennial	7-6	
1941	Centennial	1-0	Central forfeited the game for using ineligible players.
1942	Tie Game	0-0	
1942	Central	12-7	
1943	Centennial	13-0	
1943	Central	7-0	
1944	Central	40-0	Central would go on to win Colorado class A state championship.
1945	Centennial	19-0	Centennial would end up Colorado class A runner-up.
1946	Centennial	26-21	Centennial would go on to win Colorado class AA state championship.
1947	Central	33-13	Central would go on to win Colorado class AA state championship.
1948	Central	7-6	
1948	Centennial	13-0	
1949	Central	19-9	
1950	Central	40-27	First game where winner took possession of the victory bell.
1950	Central	25-15	
1951	Central	13-7	
1952	Centennial	14-0	
1953	Central	32-14	
1954	Central	24-0	
1955	Central	19-14	
1956	Tie Game	0-0	
1957	Central	19-0	
1958	Central	26-12	Central would end up Colorado class AAA runner-up.
1959	Central	13-6	
1960	Central	6-0	
1961	Central	28-14	Central would go on to win Colorado class AAA state championship.
1962	Central	13-0	
1963	Centennial	14-7	Centennial would end up Colorado class AAA state runner-up.
1964	Central	7-0	
1965	Central	46-0	Central would go on to win Colorado class AAA state championship.
1966	Tie Game	7-7	
1967	Central	10-0	
1968	Centennial	13-6	
1969	Central	44-13	
1970	Central	21-20	Central would end up Colorado class AAA runner-up.
1971	Central	6-0	
1972	Tie Game	7-7	
1973	Central	17-14	
1974	Centennial	13-12	
1975	Centennial	19-0	
1976	Central	14-7	
1977	Centennial	6-0	
1978	Centennial	13-7	
1979	Central	16-3	
1980	Centennial	19-7	
1981	Central	35-8	
1982	Central	35-0	
1983	Central	20-0	
1984	Centennial	13-6	
1985	Central	14-6	
1986	Centennial	14-0	
1987	Centennial	28-10	Centennial would go on to win Colorado class AAA state championship.
1988	Central	15-12	
1989	Centennial	29-17	
1990	Central	20-18	
1991	Centennial	40-15	
1992	Centennial	30-6	Centennial would go on to win Colorado class AAAAA state championship.
1993	Centennial	34-15	
1994	Centennial	26-0	
1995	Central	21-14	
1996	Centennial	28-25	
1997	Centennial	7-6	
1998	Central	27-9	50th Bell Game played
1999	Centennial	69-53	
2000	Central	28-13	100th rivalry game played.
2001	Centennial	20-0	
2002	Centennial	42-14	
2003	Central	19-13	
2004	Centennial	58-14	
2005	Centennial	35-13	
2006	Centennial	32-14	
2007	Central	14-6	
2008	Central	22-21 (OT)	First overtime game in series history.
2009	Central	29-20	
2010	Centennial	32-20	
2011	Centennial	51-22	
2012	Centennial	41-39	
2013	Centennial	41-29	
2014	Centennial	28-26	
2015	Central	27-24	
2016	Centennial	31-7	
2017	Centennial	14-8 (OT)	
2018	Centennial	24-12	
2019	Central	23-0	
2020	Central	17-9	
2021	Central	42-0	
2022	Central	30-0	
2023	Central	52-0	
2024	Central	56-0	
2025	Central	50-15	Central wins seven straight Bell Games; to date the longest streak of the rivalry.
2026	Central	43-0	

Decade-by-decade victories for each school:

Decade	Centennial	Central	Tie Games
1891-1900	4	2	0
1901-1910	3	1	1
1911-1920	0	0	0
1921-1930	2	8	0
1931-1940	7	4	4
1941-1950	5	8	1
1951-1960	1	8	1
1961-1970	2	7	1
1971-1980	5	4	1
1981-1990	4	6	0
1991-2000	7	3	0
2001-2010	6	4	0
2011-2020	7	3	0
2021-2030	0	6	0

As of the 2026 game, in the all-time series Central has 64 wins, Centennial has 53 wins, and the teams have tied 9 times.

In 1895 and 1896, Centennial and Central combined to form a single Pueblo high school team.

Centennial did not field a team in the 1901 or 1902 seasons, nor from 1913 to 1919.

The series was temporarily suspended after the 1907 game ended in a brawl between the two teams and their respective fan bases.

In many years the two teams would play twice each season: a regular season game, and then a special Thanksgiving Day game if neither team was playing in the state playoffs. The Thanksgiving Day games ended after the 1950 season.
