= Central High School (Pueblo, Colorado) =

Location
- 216 East Orman Avenue; Pueblo, Colorado 81004; United States; 38°15′13″N 104°37′33″W

Information
- School type: Public high school
- Established: 1881; 145 years ago
- School district: Pueblo 60
- CEEB code: 061195
- NCES School ID: 080612001037
- Principal: Destin Mehess
- Teaching staff: 42.47 (on an FTE basis)
- Grades: 9–12
- Gender: Coeducational
- Enrollment: 1,053 (2023–24)
- Student to teacher ratio: 24.79
- Colors: Blue and white
- Athletics conference: CHSAA
- Mascot: Wildcat
- Rival: Centennial High School
- Feeder schools: Pueblo School of the Arts; Risley School of Exploration
- Website: central.pueblod60.org

Central High School is one of six public high schools located in Pueblo, Colorado, United States. A part of Pueblo School District 60, the high school was the second for the city of Pueblo, and was founded in 1881. It is the only high school to have two Medal of Honor recipients, William J. Crawford (Class of '36) and Carl L. Sitter (Class of '40).

== History ==
Central first opened in 1881, and in 1886 graduated its first class of nine students. In 1889 Central introduced vocational education into its curriculum, making the district the first west of the Missouri River to introduce what was then called "manual training" into the schools.

== Architecture ==
The present Neoclassical building on Orman Avenue is built of brick and consists of five floors and an outlying building used as a gym and school meeting area. It was built in 1906. The foyer features right-facing swastikas set into the tile floor. The original Central High School building on Pitkin Avenue (later used as an elementary school) was built of pink rhyolite; the "Stone Schoolhouse" was added to the National Register of Historic Places in 1979.

== Academics ==
In the 2023–24 academic year, Central High School enrolled 1,053 students and employed 42.47 teachers (on a full-time equivalent basis), for a student-to-teacher ratio of 24.79.

The academic performance by state standards has been rated as low on the School Accountability report generated by Pueblo City Schools district. The Academic Growth is also rated as low. As of 2015, Central High School reported the second highest graduation and completion rates out of the four District 60 high schools.

=== STEM School ===
In 2013, Pueblo City Schools received a $10.3 million federal magnet school grant. Central High School was named as one of four recipients of the funds, and was designated as a STEM magnet high school. Currently, the STEM courses offered at Central include Computer Software Engineering, Introduction to Engineering, Principles of Engineering, Environmental Sustainability, Principles of Biomedical Sciences, and Human Body Systems. Central High School is also a certified PLTW school, allowing students the opportunity to earn college credit for the STEM courses they take during high school.

=== CSU-Ft Collins Alliance Partnership ===
Central High School is the only Colorado State University Alliance Partnership High School in Pueblo. It offers Central students the unique opportunity to earn a base $4,000 per year scholarship to the university, simply by being accepted into their undergraduate program.

== Athletics ==
Central competes in numerous sports in the 3-A class division. It is a member of Colorado High School Activities Association or CHSAA and is subject to their guidelines when participating in athletics. The most notable athletic tradition consists of their football team and ongoing rivalry with the oldest high school in Pueblo, Centennial High School. They are known as the Centennial Bulldogs.

=== Football ===
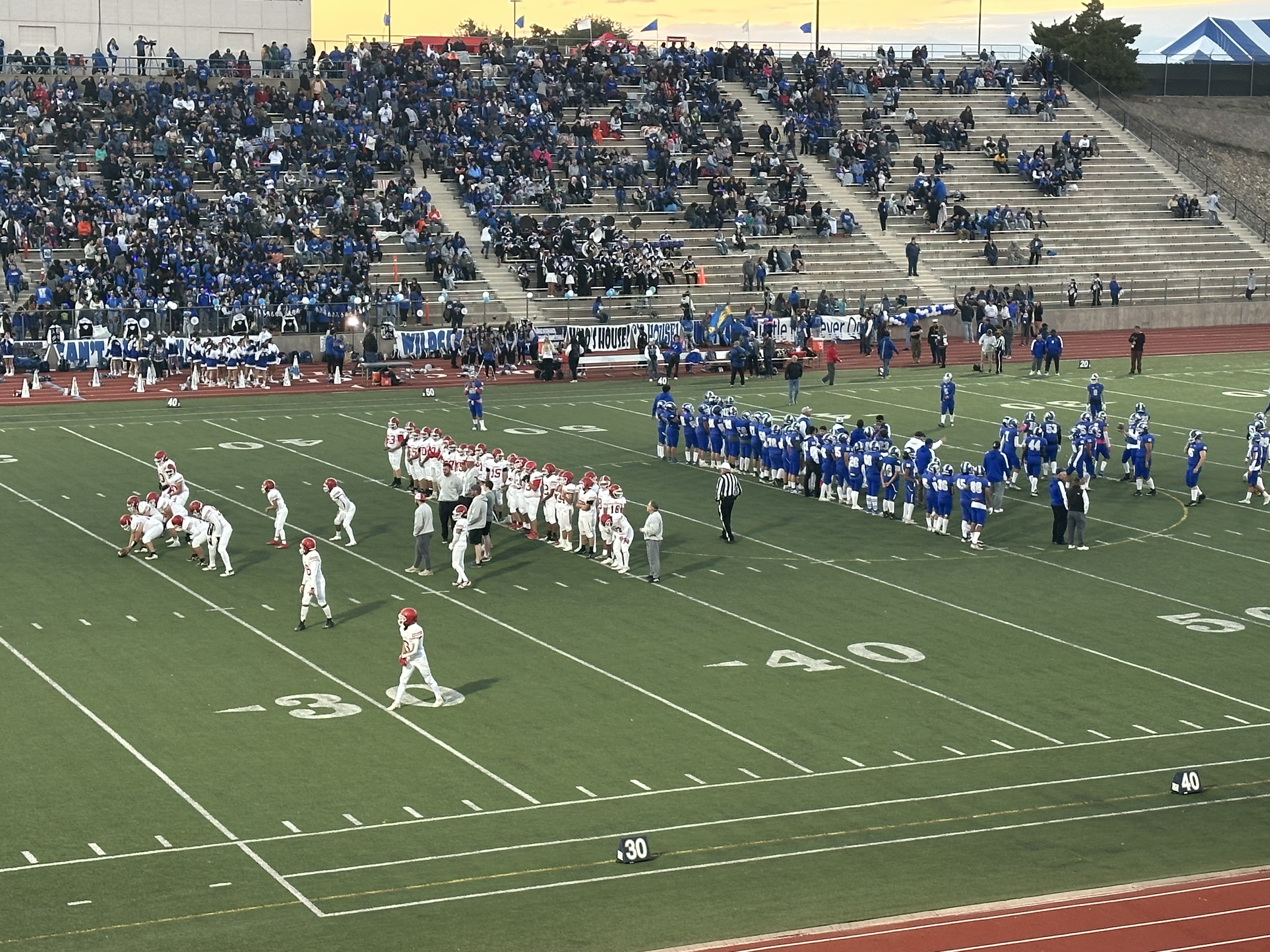
The Bell Game in 2023. The Central Wildcats are on the right.

Central High School is renowned for its football rivalry. The Bell Game is a tradition dating back to 1892. Since then, the game has been played annually, usually in October. The Central Wildcats and Centennial Bulldogs play for the right to display the trophy bell in their school and paint it their respective colors. The event is held at Earl "Dutch" Clark Stadium in Pueblo, often to a sellout crowd of up to 15,000. As of 2021, a total of 121 contests have been held. It is touted as "the oldest rivalry this side of the Mississippi". Central holds the advantage in the series, 59-53-9.

All high school football games are broadcast through the Pueblo Community College TV station.

== Demographics ==
- Hispanic 76.1%
- White 18.1%
- African American 3.3%
- Asian 0.1%
- Native American 2.3%

77% of Pueblo Central High School's students are eligible to receive a free/reduced lunch rate.

== Notable alumni ==
- Earl "Dutch" Clark, former professional football player
- William J. Crawford, Medal of Honor recipient
- Tony Falkenstein, former professional football player
- Walter W. Johnson, former Governor of Colorado
- Gary Knafelc, former NFL tight end/wide receiver
- Pete Pederson, former professional basketball player and college head coach
- Dan Rowan, comedian, notable from Rowan & Martin's Laugh-In
- Carl L. Sitter, Medal of Honor recipient
- Robert M. Stillman, US Air Force general
- Rodney Wallace, former professional football player
