= Louisville Male High School =

Public secondary school in Kentucky, United States

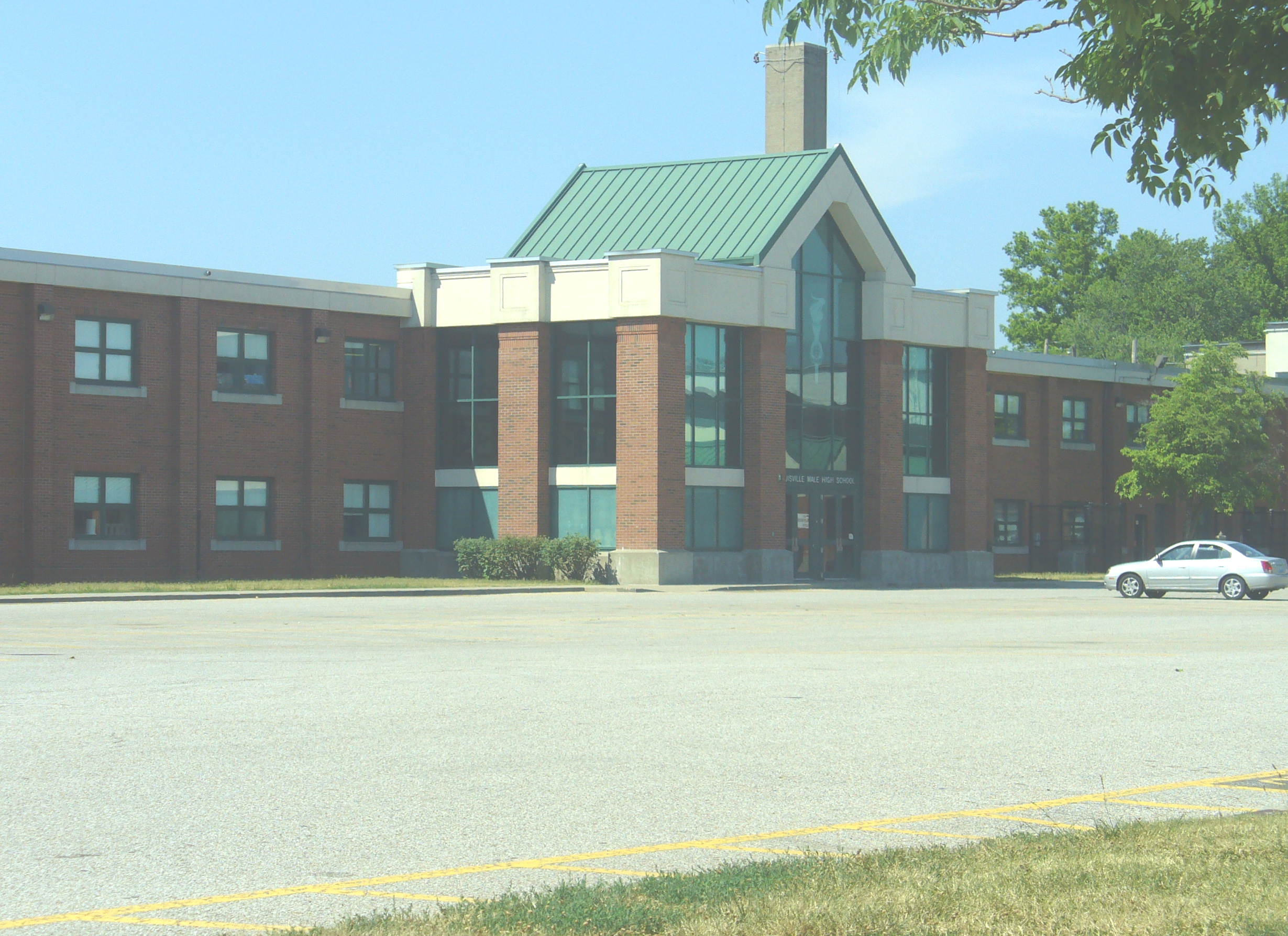
- Male High School in 2007

Location
- 4409 Preston Highway; Louisville, Kentucky; United States; 38.185°N 85.721°W

Information
- Type: Public secondary
- Established: 1856
- School district: Jefferson County Public Schools
- Principal: Keith Cathey
- Teaching staff: 91.43 (on an FTE basis)
- Grades: 9–12
- Enrollment: 1,904 (2023–2024)
- Student to teacher ratio: 20.82
- Colors: Purple & Gold
- Slogan: "For God, For Country, For Male."
- Fight song: "Dear Old High School"
- Mascot: Bulldogs
- Rival: DuPont Manual
- Accreditation: Southern Association of Colleges and Schools, since 1913
- Newspaper: The Brook'n'Breck
- Website: Louisville Male HS

Louisville Male High School is a public co-educational secondary school serving students in grades 9 through 12 in the south side of Louisville, Kentucky, US. It is part of the Jefferson County Public School District.

== History ==
=== Ninth and Chestnut (1856–1897) ===
Male was founded in 1856, being the oldest high school west of the Allegheny Mountains. In 1861, Male was designated The University of Public Schools of Louisville and awarded bachelor's degrees until 1921, after other high schools were established in the years following. the school was named Louisville Male High School due to a separate Louisville Girls High School. The "H" was kept as the school's letter due to being the original high school.

=== Corner of Brook Street and Breckinridge Street (1915–1991) ===
In the years after World War I, Male's academic offerings included a corps of cadets and a Junior Reserve Officers' Training Corps. From 1921 to 1932, these programs were led by Brigadier General James R. Lindsay.

In the 1970s, Male was chosen as the Traditional High School, becoming the first magnet program in the school district.

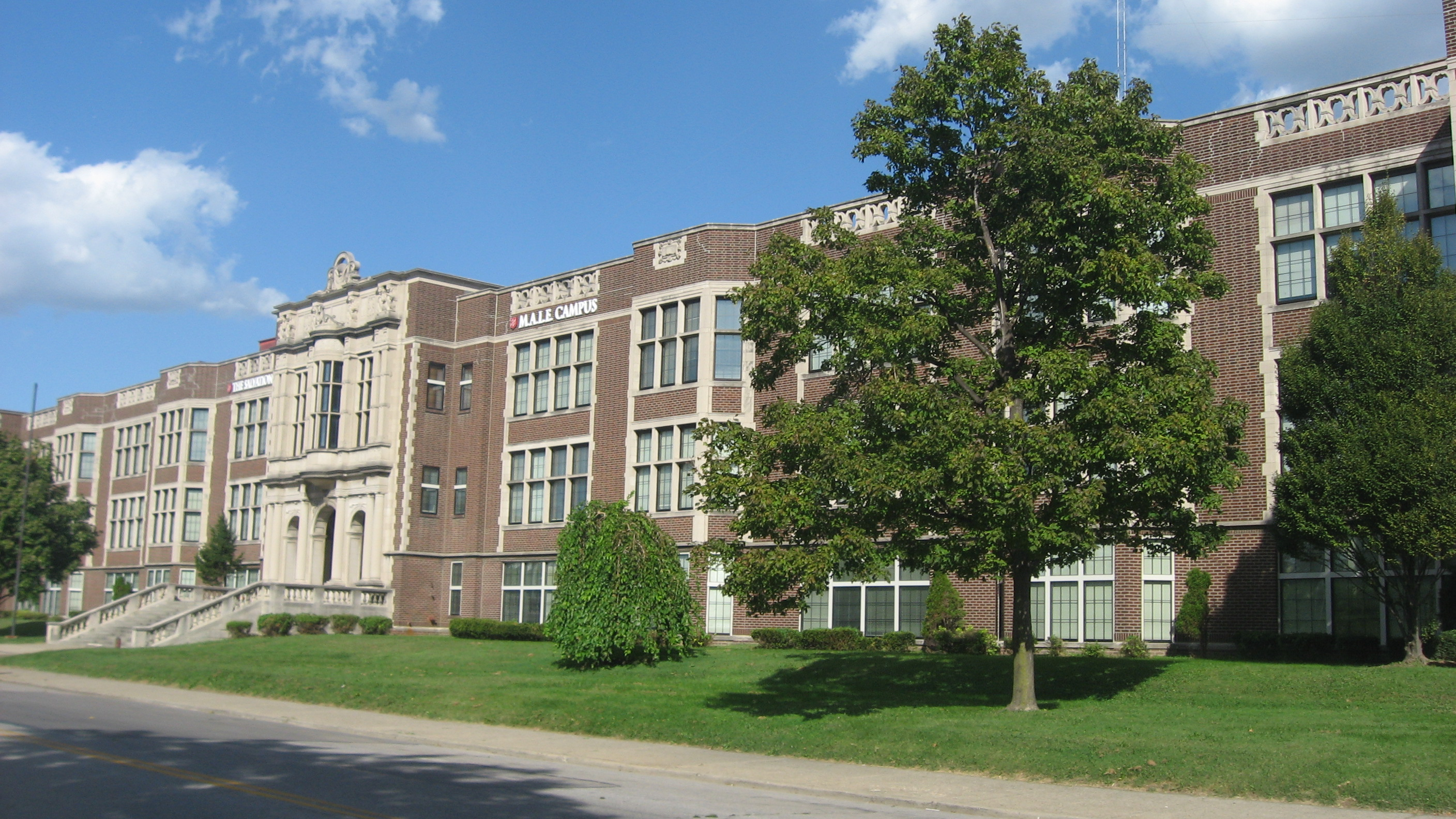
Third site (1915–1991) in 2012

In 1976, an early-morning bomb explosion on Labor Day caused damage to the school's gymnasium; it occurred during several days of anti-busing protests in the Louisville area. The FBI was called in to investigate.

This location (38.2404°N 85.7523°W) is now owned by the Salvation Army and is a historic landmark in Louisville.

=== Durrett Campus (1991–present) ===
In August 1991, Male moved to its current campus at 4409 Preston Highway, an educational facility that doubled the instructional, laboratory, library and campus space. Since it has moved to this location, the school has won two United States Department of Education Blue Ribbon awards. The site was previously Sallie P. Durrett High School, which became the Durrett Education Center in the early 1980s and was used by Jefferson County Public Schools Library Media Services until 1991. The adjoining Gheens Academy, which opened in 1983, was previously Prestonia Elementary School.

=== Gheens Academy ===
Gheens Academy opened in 1983 after having previously been Prestonia Elementary School. Gheens is a separate building from Male and functions as a place for other classrooms. Classes in Gheens are generally more oriented towards elective activities and other arts. Gheen academy was temporarily home to the W.E.B. DuBois Academy.

== Academics ==
The school runs a unique curriculum that is different from the other public high schools in the city. All students participate in the College Preparatory Program so as to aid in a smooth the transition to higher education.

Students have an opportunity to graduate with a Commonwealth Diploma, which demands more than the required units for graduating high school in JCPS. One of the stipulations is the successful completion (i.e., receiving a grade of "C" or its equivalent) in 6 AP courses in the areas of English, science/mathematics, foreign language, and elective.

== Athletics ==
On Saturday, November 18, 1893, the annual Male-Manual football rivalry, the longest running, continuously played, high school football series in Kentucky, began. Their football team is a perennial state power, and in addition to its long-running rivalry with duPont Manual High School, Male is also a close rival with St. Xavier High School, with the annual contest usually determining the fate of the district champion; however, due to the state's realignment of high school football into a six-class system starting in 2007–08, Male also has a rivalry with Trinity High School in football. The school offers football, basketball, baseball, softball, bowling, tennis, soccer, field hockey, wrestling, swimming, track and field, lacrosse, and Marching Band.

=== Venues ===
Maxwell Field, formerly called High School Park, is the football stadium located behind Male's former location at the Brook and Breck campus.

Veterans Memorial Stadium is the current football stadium, located behind the Durrett campus. It is named in memory of the schools alumni who have died in World War II.

Edwards Field is the current baseball field for the school, named after Bill Edwards. The Field is also home to the W. Clyde Glass Press Box.

=== Sports championships ===
State championships
| Sport | Sex | Years won |
|---|---|---|
| Baseball | Men | 1944 |
| Basketball | Men | 1945, 1970, 1971, 1975, *2020 (*Tournament cancelled due to COVID-19 pandemic / unanimous number one team) |
| Football | Men | 1924, 1937, 1943, 1944, 1945, 1951, 1954, 1960, 1963, 1964, 1993, 1998, 2000, 2015, 2018 |
| Golf | Men | 1941, 1942, 1944, 1945, 1946, 1947, 1948 |
| Soccer | Men | 1983 |
| Soccer | Women | 1993, 1994 |
| Track and field | Men | 1921, 1923, 1924, 1927, 1929, 1932, 1936, 1942, 1943, 1945, 1946, 1947, 1948, 1949, 1952, 1966, 1967, 1968, 1969, 1970, 1971, 1972, 1994, 1995, 1996, 1998, 2007, 2008, 2009, 2010, 2011, 2017 |
| Track and field | Women | 1966, 1968, 1972, 2016, 2017, 2018 |
| Softball | Women | 2019 |
| Esports | Mixed | 2023 |

== Notable alumni ==
- General James R. Allen – Commander-in-Chief of the Military Airlift Command
- Vinny Anthony II – NFL wide receiver for the Atlanta Falcons
- Chris Barclay – professional football player
- Ralph Beard – professional basketball player
- Winston Bennett – professional basketball player
- Porter Bibb – the first publisher of Rolling Stone
- Charles Booker - American politician
- Emery Bopp – artist
- Louis Brandeis – the first Jewish Supreme Court justice
- Michael Bush – professional football player
- Valarie Coleman – professional flutist and composer
- Richard Priest Dietzman – chief justice of the Kentucky Court of Appeals
- Tony Driver – professional football player
- Marcus Green – professional football player
- Sean Green – professional baseball pitcher
- Darrell Griffith – professional basketball player
- D.J. Johnson – professional football player
- Kenny Kuhn – professional baseball player
- Bubba McCollum – professional football player
- Warren Oates – film actor
- Chris Redman – professional football player
- Sarah Stalker – politician
- Hunter S. Thompson – journalist and author of Fear and Loathing in Las Vegas
- Nate Hobbs – professional football player

== See also ==
- Public schools in Louisville, Kentucky
