= DuPont Manual High School =

duPont Manual High School
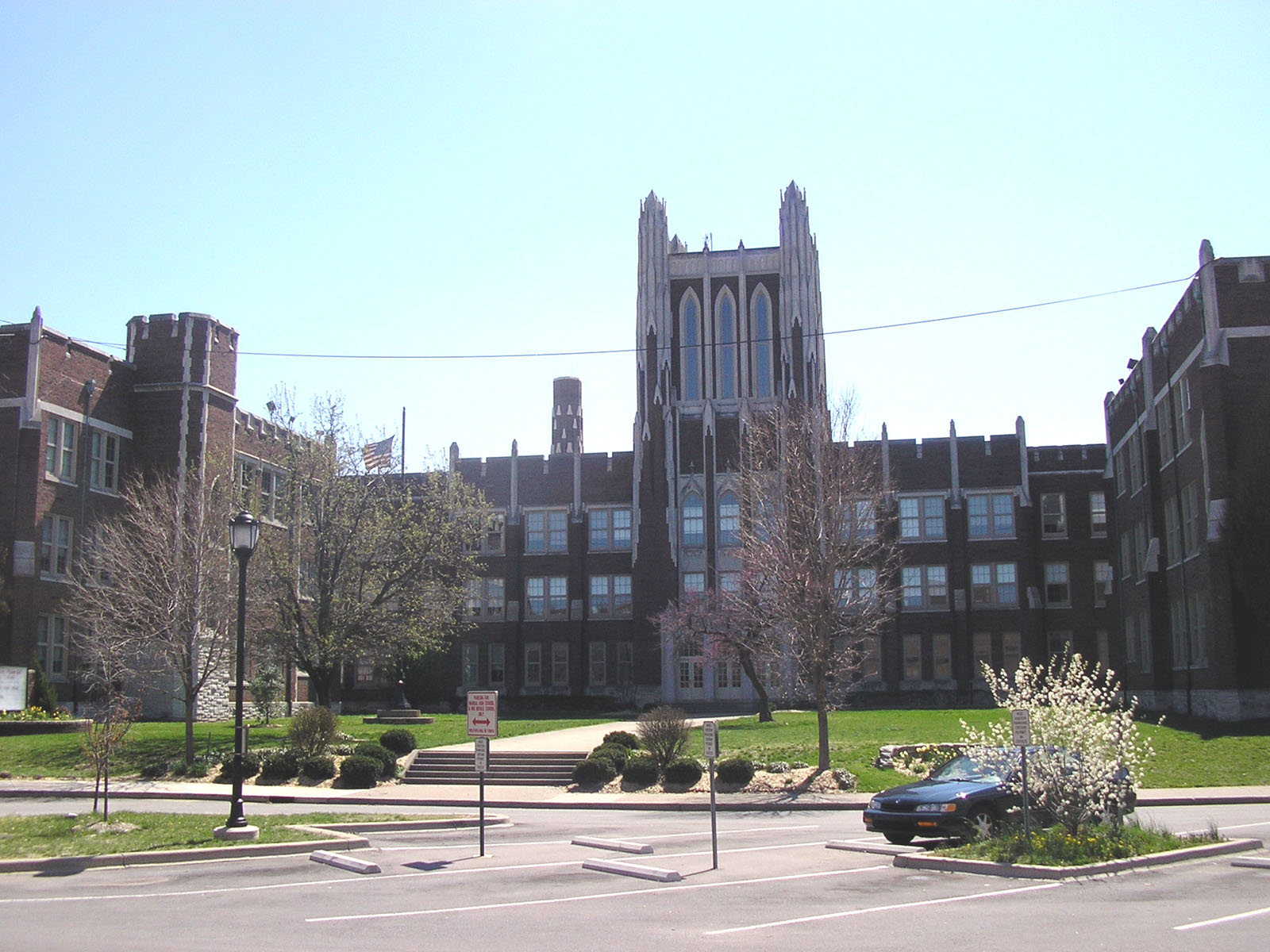
- The north side of duPont Manual's main building

Location
- 120 West Lee Street; Louisville, Kentucky 40208; United States; 38°13′19″N 85°45′29″W

Information
- School type: Public Secondary Magnet
- Established: 1892
- School district: Jefferson County Public Schools
- Principal: Michael Newman
- Staff: 111.00 (FTE)
- Grades: 9–12
- Enrollment: 1,922 (2023–2024)
- Student to teacher ratio: 17.32
- Campus size: 17 acres (6.9 ha)
- Campus type: Urban
- Colors: Crimson and white
- Team name: Crimsons/Rams
- Rival: Louisville Male High School
- Newspaper: On The Record
- Website: www.dupontmanual.com

duPont Manual High School is a public magnet high school located in the Old Louisville neighborhood of Louisville, Kentucky, United States. It serves students in grades 9–12. It is a part of the Jefferson County Public School District. DuPont Manual is recognized by the United States Department of Education as a Blue Ribbon School.

Manual, funded by Mr. A. V. duPont, opened in 1892 as an all-male manual training school. It was the second public high school in Louisville. Manual merged with its rival, Male High School, into a consolidated school from 1915 to 1919. Manual permanently merged with the Louisville Girls High School in 1950 and moved into their Gothic-style three-story building, built in 1934. In 2004, after conducting a poll, Louisville's Courier-Journal newspaper listed Manual as one of Louisville residents' ten favorite buildings. Manual experienced a decline in discipline and test scores in the 1970s. In 1984, Manual became a magnet school, allowing students from throughout the district to apply to five specialized programs of study, or magnets.

Manual and Male High School have the oldest football rivalry in the state, dating back to 1893. Manual's football team has won five state titles and claims two national championships. In the 1980s and 1990s Manual became a prominent academic school and has been included several times in lists of America's top high schools in Redbook and Newsweek magazines. The high school has been recognized as a Perennial Top Academic School in Kentucky and holds the most national merit semi-finalists among all JCPS High Schools.

== History ==
=== duPont Manual Training High School ===
In 1892, Louisville factory owner Alfred Victor du Pont donated $150,000 to the board of Louisville Public Schools to establish a training school to teach young men industrial arts ("manual") skills that would fit them for their duties in life. The Victorian building was built on the corner of Brook and Oak Streets by the firm of Clark and Loomis, which also designed the Speed Art Museum and Waverly Hills Sanatorium. After Manual moved out of the building it was used as a Middle School until 1974 when it was converted to apartments. Manual's first principal, Henry Kleinschmid, was a favorite of duPont but was unpopular with the school board, which conspired to replace him in 1895. Despite a summer of controversy and protest from the duPont family, Manual's first two graduating classes and the four major local newspapers, the board replaced him with Harry Brownell on July 2.

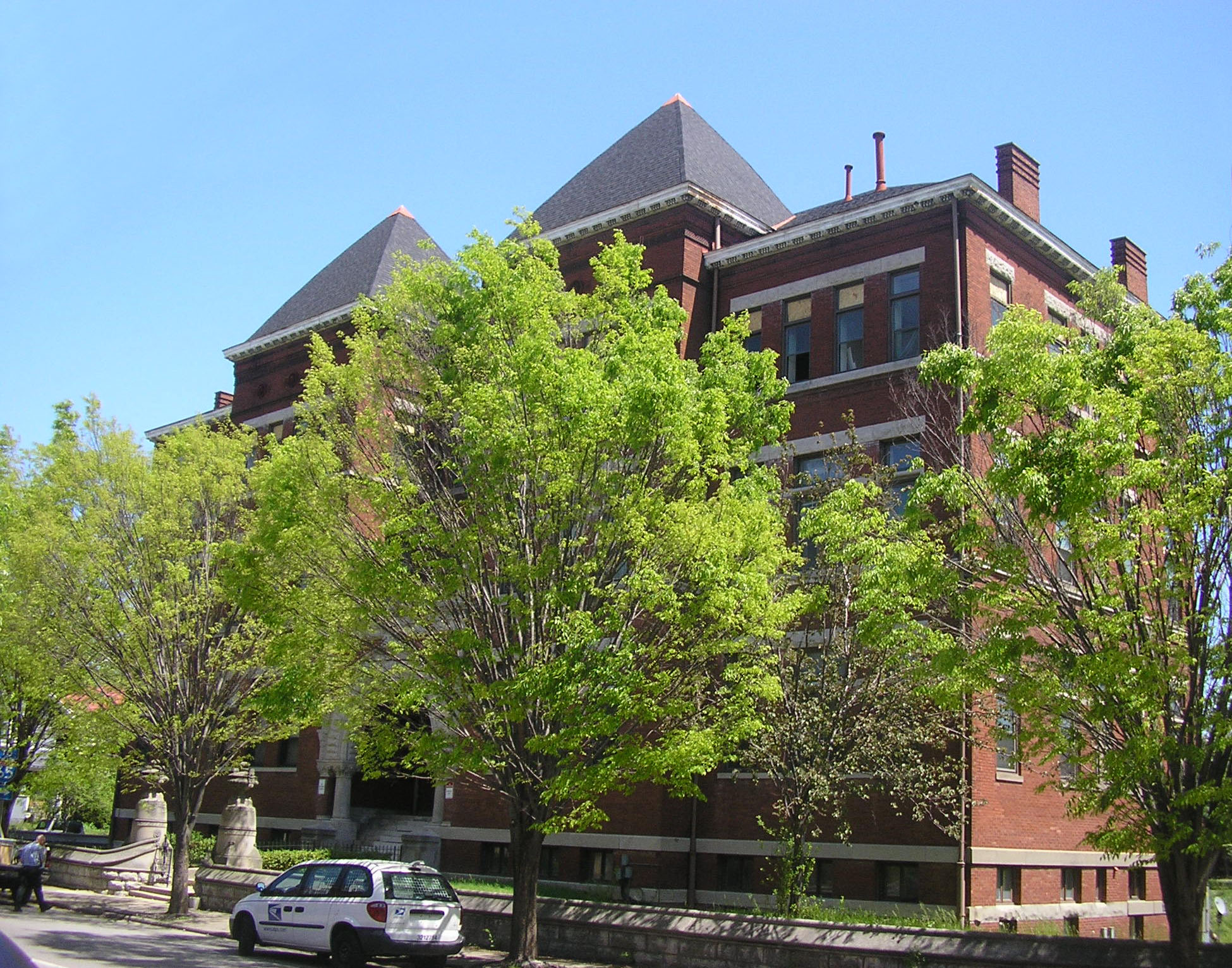
The original school building in 2009, after conversion to apartments

Manual was initially a three-year school with some general academic classes and an emphasis on mechanical and industrial training. Although graduates recall the school being viewed as blue-collar and academically inferior to Male High School in its early days, numerous early graduates went on to become medical doctors, and students published a literary magazine called The Crimson from 1899 to 1955. In order to accommodate newly added French and Latin classes, Manual was expanded to a four-year school in 1901. In 1911, Manual became the first school in Kentucky to serve lunches to students.

In 1913, Louisville Public Schools announced a plan to merge Manual and its rival Male High School into Louisville Boys High so that the two schools could share a new $300,000 facility. The plan took effect in 1915. Industrial training classes continued at the old Manual building. Parents objected to their children having to travel between the two buildings and the consolidation did not save the school board any money, so they voted to end the experiment in 1919. The new building became Male's home for the next 70 years and Manual returned to its old building at Brook and Oak. In 1923 an expansion added new laboratories, a cafeteria, and the largest gym ever built in Louisville at the time. The addition eventually burned and had to be destroyed in 1991.

Manual's enrollment numbers, which had hovered around 400 since the 1890s, soared from 429 in 1919 to 1,039 in 1925. The Manual Crimsons football team, which had also been consolidated with Male's from 1915 to 1918, had great success in the 1920s, beating Male two years in a row for the first time in its history. Manual shared athletic facilities with Male for many years, but in the early 1920s alumni raised funds to construct Manual Stadium. The stadium opened in 1924 with 14,021 permanent seats. It was one of the largest high school stadiums in America at the time. The original structure was condemned and closed in 1952 after years of heavy use and minimal upkeep, and was reopened after being rebuilt in 1954. Its modern capacity is 11,463.

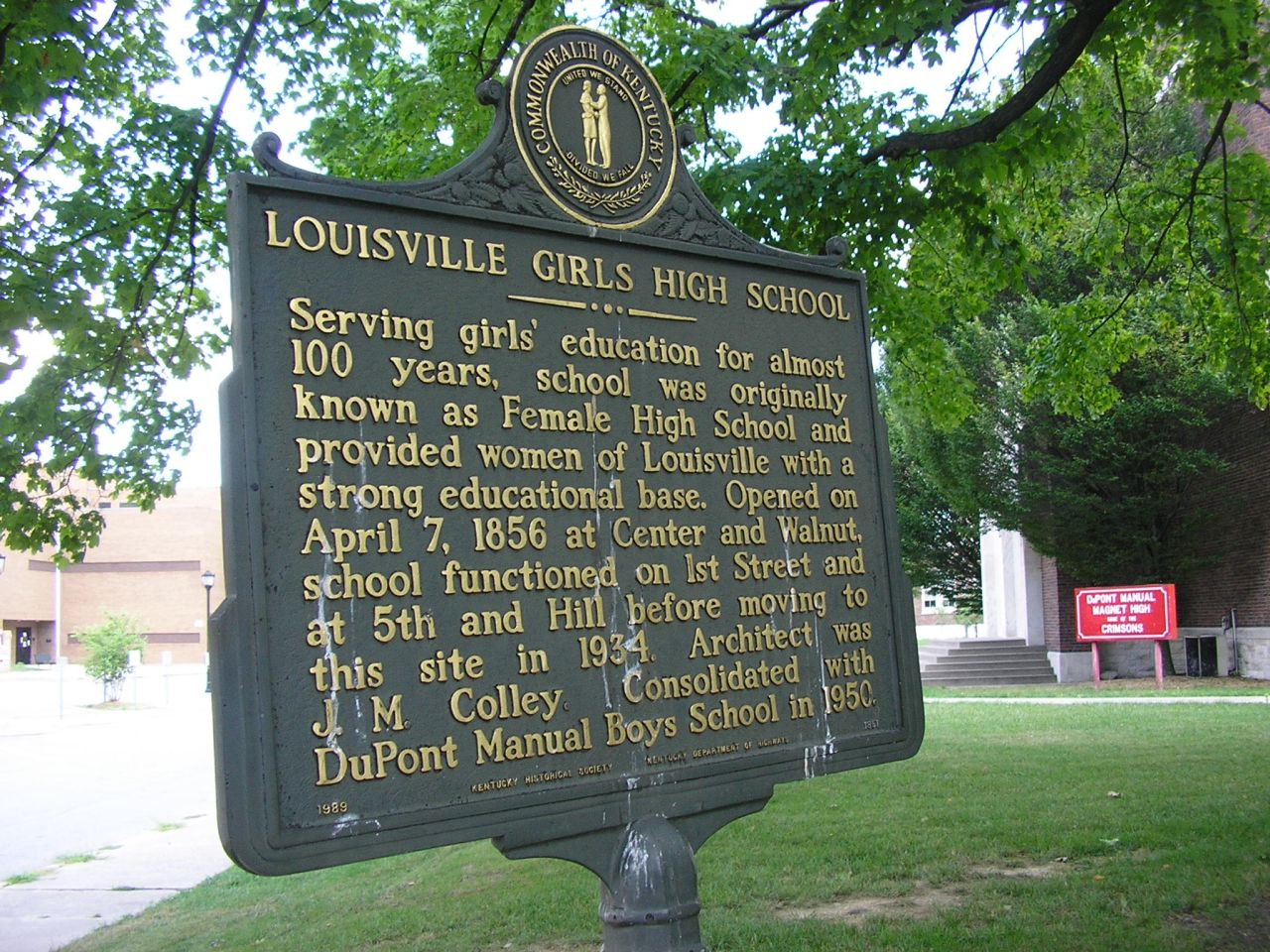
Historic marker for Louisville Girls High School

=== Louisville Girls High School ===
The Louisville Girls High School opened as Female High School in 1856 at what became the intersection of Armory Place and Muhammad Ali Boulevard. It was the female counterpart to Male High School, also opened in 1856, and they were the first two public high schools in Louisville. Female High School moved to a location on First Street north of Chestnut in 1864 and remained there until 1899 when it moved to a location at Fifth and Hill Streets. It changed its name to Louisville Girls High School in 1911.

In 1934, the school moved into Reuben Post Halleck Hall, which had just been completed. The building was initially home to the Girls High School on the second and third floors, and Louisville Junior High School on the first. Over 12,000 women graduated from the school in its 94 years of operation.

=== Merger ===
By the 1940s, budget concerns and national trends made it clear that Louisville Girls High School and duPont Manual would merge into one coeducational school. They finally did so in September 1950 and remained in the old Louisville Girls High School building. This fusion of institutions resulted in the birth of the modern duPont Manual High School – dropping 'Training' from its previous name. The same school building remains in use today, although two major additions have since been made. The middle school located on the building's first floor became Manly Junior High and moved to Manual's old building at Brook and Oak.

The merged school began developing traditions such as Homecoming in 1951, and Red and White Day in 1953. Red and White Day eventually became a full week of school spirit related activities preceding the annual Male-Manual football game. Two traditions of the sexually segregated past, sororities and the all-male Mitre Club, persisted into the 1950s as unofficial organizations but gradually faded away. Students began publishing a newspaper, The Crimson Record, in 1955.

Following the Brown v. Board of Education Supreme Court decision, Manual became racially integrated without controversy in 1956 and graduated its first two black students in 1958. Starting in the 1960s, Manual began to face problems associated with inner city schools in the United States as economically advantaged families moved towards Louisville's suburbs. Manual was exempt from court-ordered busing in the 1970s because its racial makeup already met federal guidelines.

On November 11, 1976, what school board members referred to as a race-related riot occurred on campus, injuring 16 and leading to six arrests and 60 suspensions. Students and school administrators agreed that there was an atmosphere of racial tension brewing at Manual in the 1970s that led to the riot. In his 2005 book on the history of Manual, Mike McDaniel wrote that November 11, 1976 was "quite probably the worst day in the history of Manual."

The late 1960s and 1970s were a time of major change at Manual. A new wing featuring a gym with a seating capacity of 2,566 opened in 1971. The school had as many as 3,360 students in the 1971–72 school year, necessitating 17 portable classrooms in the front and rear courtyards. Manual still had grades seven through twelve at this time, and overcrowding gradually began to improve after Manual dropped the seventh and eight grades when Noe Middle School opened in 1974. Throughout the decade the administration gradually dropped the last vestiges of its manual training emphasis as the number of shop classes dwindled from 16 in 1971 to three in 1979. The Youth Performing Arts School, actually a magnet school within Manual, opened in 1978 and, along with the changing curriculum, presaged Manual's transition to an academically intensive magnet school in the 1980s.

=== Magnet school ===
Manual became a magnet school in 1984, creating specialty programs and allowing students from around the district to apply to attend. The change initially met with a mixed reaction, especially as most freshmen and sophomores were to be transferred to other schools. One critic in the black community called the plan "one-way busing". A few days after the proposal was announced, about 300 students walked out of class at Manual and marched to Central High School, where most of them were being transferred, in protest. The protest succeeded in persuading the school board to modify the proposal to exclude sophomores from being transferred.

The magnet programs succeeded in attracting applicants and by the mid-1990s only about a third of students who applied were accepted. In the midst of the transition to magnet school, Manual underwent a $1.9 million building improvement plan which added computer and science labs. Also in 1991, the United States Department of Education recognized Manual as a Blue Ribbon School, the highest honor the department can bestow on a school. The school earned a Blue Ribbon award again in 2020.

Many interior shots of the 1999 film The Insider were filmed at Manual. Dr. Jeffrey Wigand, the subject of the film, taught science and Japanese at Manual after he was fired by tobacco company Brown & Williamson in 1993.

== Building and campus ==
Manual classrooms and offices are located in three buildings spread over two city blocks. The main building was originally called Reuben Post Halleck Hall and was home to the Louisville Girls High School before it merged with Manual. The Gothic-style building was completed in 1934 at a cost of $1.1 million. The 9-acre (36,000 m^{2}) tract it was built on had previously been the site of the old Masonic Widows and Orphans Home.

In 1967 an urban renewal program demolished a residential block east of the main building to create a running track and various athletic fields. The project doubled Manual's campus to its modern size of 17 acres (69,000 m^{2}). This was a part of a larger city-funded effort which created Noe Middle School north of Manual and increased the size of the University of Louisville campus, which was originally touted as a plan to create a continuous chain of schools over many blocks. Manual even became a home for two of the university's women's athletic teams. In the 1980s, the U of L women's basketball team used Manual's gym as a part-time home, playing a total of 40 games in eight seasons there. The U of L volleyball team used the Manual gym as its primary home from 1977 through 1990, after which the team moved into the newly built Cardinal Arena on its own campus. In 1992, Manual began a $3.5 million renovation of the main building which included a new roof and a glass-enclosed cafeteria for juniors and seniors.

The Youth Performing Arts School has its own building a half-block from Manual's main building. It was completed in 1978 at a cost of $1.5 million as the final stage of the same plan that expanded Manual's campus and built Noe. Noe had been built without an auditorium in anticipation of a theater-oriented school being built on site. The YPAS building includes production facilities, a costume shop and an 886-seat proscenium-style theater. The YPAS building did not contain extensive classroom space, however, and for many years teachers conducted YPAS classes in hallways and on loading docks if other space wasn't available. Since 1993, YPAS has used an adjacent facility, built in 1899 and formerly home to Cochran Elementary, as an annex.

== Academics ==
Manual focused on industrial training early in its history, but by the late 1970s it had a standard curriculum. In 1980, Iowa Test of Basic Skills scores ranked Manual 23rd out of the 24 high schools in the county. Under principal Joe Liedtke, academics improved, especially after Manual became a magnet school in 1984 and could attract students from throughout the county.

All students enroll in one of five magnet programs. The High School University (HSU) magnet offers a traditional college preparatory curriculum with electives. The Math/Science/Technology (MST) magnet specifically prepares students for college programs in engineering, science and math. Minimal requirements for MST students include courses in algebra, trigonometry, calculus (including mandatory AP Calculus), biology, chemistry and computer programming. The Journalism & Communication (J&C) magnet focuses on journalism, publishing, and media production. To earn class credit, J&C students can participate in the creation of the school's national award-winning publications and productions: yearbook (The Crimson), a city-wide youth newsmagazine (On the Record), literary magazine (One Blue Wall), a school news website (RedEye) and a daily morning television show called CSPN-TV, which is streamed online and broadcast to classrooms. The J&C program was formerly known as CMA (Communications and Media Arts), but the name was changed so that the Manual program's specific emphasis on journalism would be reflected in the name, distinguishing the magnet from others in the district with similar names.

Admission to the HSU, MST and J&C magnets are decided by a committee of Manual teachers based on academic performance as measured by prior school grades and the Commonwealth Accountability Testing System, although extracurricular involvement is also considered. The acceptance rate to each magnet varies with the number of applicants in any given year; in the mid-1990s about a third of applicants to these three magnets were selected each year. Admission the other two magnets, Visual Arts and the Youth Performing Arts School, are decided based primarily on auditions.

The Visual Arts magnet is located in a wing of art classrooms and features an art show each year for graduating seniors. The Visual Arts magnet provides students with the opportunity to work with a variety of media, including clay/sculpture, fibers, printmaking, painting, drawing and graphic design. The Math/Science/Technology program and the Youth Performing Arts School have achieved national recognition on multiple occasions.

In 1994, Manual began offering Advanced Placement (AP) courses. In 2001 it offered 45 AP courses, more than any other school in the state. Qualifying students may take college courses free of charge at the University of Louisville, which is located directly south of Manual. In 2000, Manual implemented block scheduling, which allowed students to take eight classes per year, which are scheduled four per day on alternating days.

Since 2000, Manual has held Kentucky's state record of 52 National Merit Semifinalists, ranking third in the United States for that year. Manual's academic team won state titles at Governor's Cup, Kentucky's top high school academic competition, in 1993, 1994, 2005, and 2013. Matt Morris, a Manual graduate who was on the 1993 and 1994 teams, was the 1994 Teen Champion on Jeopardy!. Three other Manual students have competed on Jeopardy!. Manual's academic teams have also won both National Science Bowl and National Academic League championships, and achieved 7th place at the NAQT's High School National Championships. Manual has a history of one of the top policy debate programs in the state. In the 1990s Manual students won the Jefferson County championships most years and qualified teams for the National Forensic League tournament and the TOC Tournament of Champions. Manual has been mentioned several times in lists of America's top high schools in Redbook and Newsweek magazines. In 2002, Manual was separated from the rest of the schools in its district and made to hold its own regional science fair.

In 2015, duPont Manual had the distinction of being the high school that sent the most students to the INTEL International Science and Engineering Fair (ISEF).

In 2022, duPont Manual was ranked #47 in the National Rankings, #1 in Kentucky High Schools, #1 in Louisville, KY Metro Area High Schools, and #1 in Jefferson County Public Schools High Schools.

=== Youth Performing Arts School ===
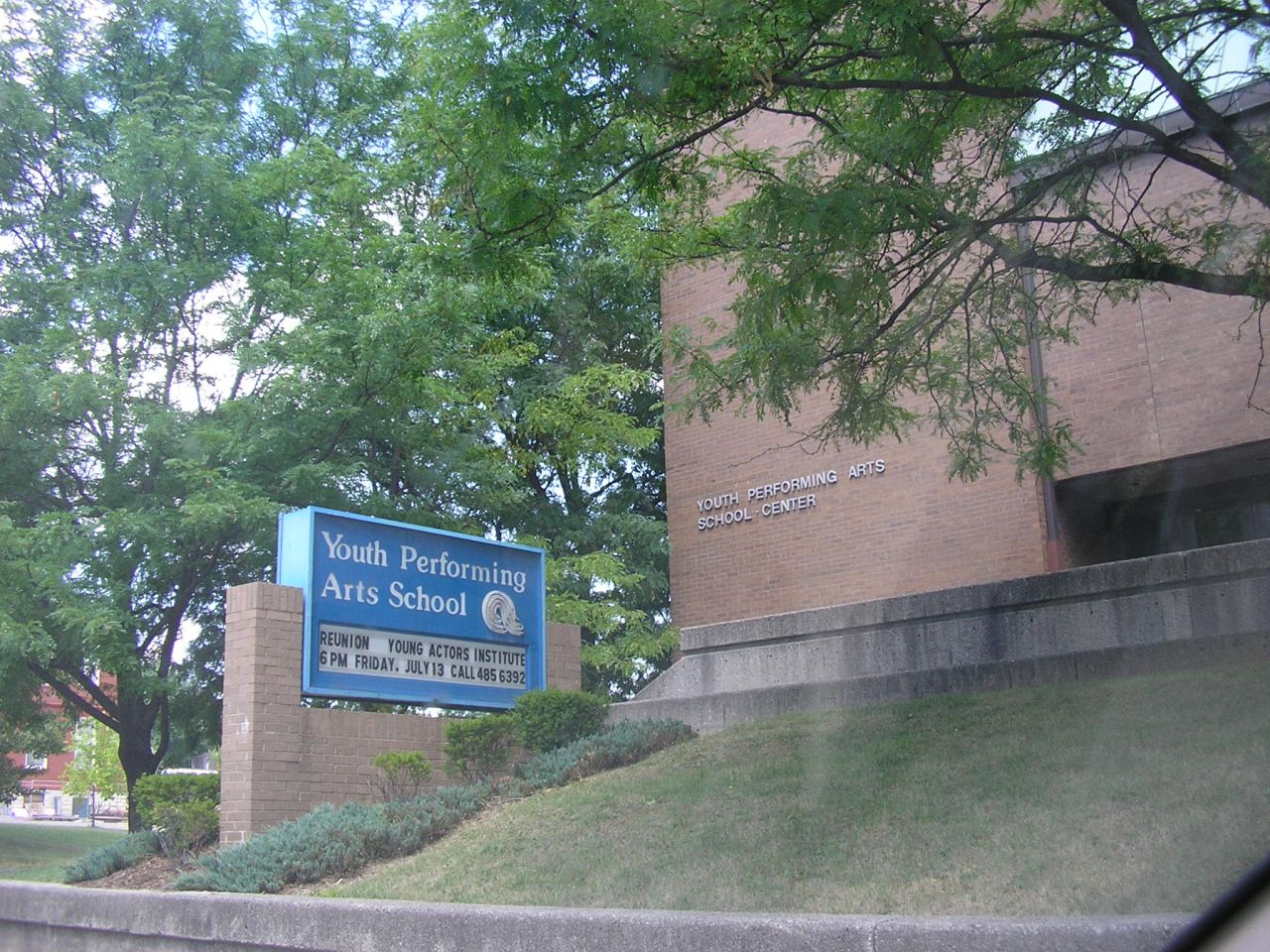
Main YPAS building

The Youth Performing Arts School (YPAS) is one of only two programs in Kentucky allowing high school students to major in performing arts. Between 1995 and 2005, 90% of YPAS students received college scholarships totaling an average of over one million dollars per year. YPAS has its own building a half-block from Manual's main building, which includes classrooms, production facilities, a costume shop and an 886-seat proscenium-style theater. Since 1993, YPAS has used an adjacent facility, built in 1899 and formerly home to Cochran Elementary, as an annex.

YPAS is one of Manual's magnet programs and YPAS students take their academic classes at Manual and must complete the same academic requirements as any public school student in Kentucky. Unlike the other magnets, YPAS is semi-autonomous; it has its own assistant principals, counselor, administrative staff, and parents' organization. Many Manual students take classes at YPAS, even if it is not their academic major.

Students at YPAS major in vocal music, instrumental music (band, orchestra, piano, or guitar), dance, theater, design and production, or musical theatre. YPAS instructors are school teachers recruited from around the district for their backgrounds in the arts. The YPAS choir was the only chorus to perform at the January 2001 inauguration of President George W. Bush.

== Athletics ==
=== Other sports ===
John Reccius, an early Major League Baseball player, organized Manual's first baseball team in 1900. An early baseball star was Ferdie Schupp, who would go on to pitch in the 1917 World Series, but left Manual two months before graduating. Manual claims seven "mythical" state baseball championships and has won six official ones, most recently in 1962. A total of ten Manual players have played in Major League Baseball, most notably Pee Wee Reese.

The varsity cheerleaders have won several NCA National Championship titles. In 1997, 1998, 2004, and 2005, they won the Large Varsity Division, and in 2003 and 2006 they won the Medium Varsity Division title. Varsity boys' soccer was second at states in 2005 and third in 2004.

In 2006, the Manual girls' cross country team won the school's first team title after placing second in 2004 and 2005. The 2006 win was the first championship for a Jefferson County, Kentucky Class AAA Public School since 1980. In 2007, the Manual boys' cross country team also won a Class AAA state championship.

The swim team maintained state titles from 2003 to 2008. From 2004 through 2008, Manual won the Combined Girls' and Boys' State Championship, and the girls maintained their own state championship from 2005 through 2008.

The boys' tennis team achieved their best finish at the KHSAA State Tennis Tournament in 2008 by winning the team title. Previously, their best result had come in 2006 when they tied rival St. Xavier High School for second place. The boys' team also won the state doubles title in 2006, which was the first state title in Ram tennis history on the boys' side. The team had five consecutive runner up positions from the 2001—2002 year until the 2005—2006 year. In 2008, the Manual boys' tennis team went on to win the first ever regional tournament in Manual history. The state team won the state title in 2008, making Manual the second public school to ever win the title.

The boys' bowling team won the state title in 2010. The school also offers basketball, dance (called the Dazzlers), field hockey, golf, lacrosse, and volleyball, among other sports teams.

The varsity field hockey team won the state title in 2011 for the first time in the history of the program.

DuPont Manual girls' lacrosse has won many state titles and tournament trophies since 2001, when the program was developed.

== Notable alumni and faculty ==
Alumni

- James Gilbert Baker, astronomer and optician
- Michelle Banzer, 2007 Miss Kentucky USA
- Chad Broskey, actor, most often on the Disney Channel
- Bud Bruner, boxing trainer and manager
- Keenan Burton, NFL football player
- Nathaniel Cartmell, Olympic gold medalist
- James S. Coleman, sociologist
- Bryce Cosby (2017), professional football cornerback
- Paige Davis (1987), theater performer, host of Trading Spaces on TLC from 2001 to 2005.
- Bremer Ehrler, Jefferson County Judge-Executive and sheriff
- Sara Gettelfinger (1995), Broadway performer
- Stratton Hammon, architect
- Bruce Hoblitzell, former Mayor of Louisville
- Malachi Lawrence, NFL linebacker for the Dallas Cowboys
- Sherman Lewis, Heisman Trophy runner-up
- Victor M. Longstreet, U.S. Assistant Secretary of the Navy (Financial Management), 1962–65
- Mitch McConnell, United States Senator from Kentucky, Senate minority leader
- Morgan McGarvey, U.S. Representative from Kentucky
- John Jacob Niles, "Dean of American Balladeers"
- Yared Nuguse, U.S. Olympian and record holder in the 1 mile run
- Travis Prentice, college and professional football player
- Pee Wee Reese (1937), baseball player
- Aidan Robbins (2019), NFL running back for the Cleveland Browns
- Nicole Scherzinger (1996), lead singer of the Pussycat Dolls
- Joseph D. Scholtz, former mayor of Louisville
- Gene Snyder, U.S. Representative from Kentucky

Faculty

- Jeffrey Wigand, American biochemist and former vice president of research and development at Brown & Williamson, blew the whistle on tobacco tampering at the company in 1996, inspiration for the 1999 film The Insider, former Teacher of the Year in the state of Kentucky

== See also ==
- Public schools in Louisville, Kentucky
