= Bowler (surname) =

Bowler is a surname. Notable people with the surname include:

- Alida Bowler (1887–1968), American social worker and educator
- Bertie Bowler, English footballer
- Bill Bowler, Canadian ice hockey player
- George Bowler, English professional footballer
- Gerry Bowler (1919–2006), Northern Irish footballer
- Grant Bowler, Australian actor
- Grant Bowler (baseball), American Major League Baseball player
- Henry Alexander Bowler (1824–1903), English painter and academic
- Holden Bowler (1912–2001), American athlete, singer and businessman who served as the namesake for Holden Caulfield in J.D. Salinger's novel The Catcher in the Rye
- J. Andrew Bowler (1862–1935), African American educator and Baptist minister
- Jade Bowler (born 2000), British YouTuber known as Unjaded Jade
- James Bowler (disambiguation), several people
- Jeff Bowler, American film and television producer
- John Bowler (disambiguation), several people
- Joseph Bowler, American artist and illustrator
- Kate Bowler, Canadian academic and writer
- Larry Bowler, Republican politician from the State of California
- Max L. Bowler (1881–1949), American businessman and politician
- Michael Bowler, English football player
- Norman Bowler, British actor
- Peter Bowler (cricketer), English born Australian cricketer
- Peter Bowler (lexicographer), Australian lexicographer and author
- Peter J. Bowler, historian of biology
- Phil Bowler, American jazz double-bassist
- Shaun Bowler (born 1958), American political scientist
- Shirley D. Bowler, Louisiana Republican legislator
- Thomas William Bowler (d. 1869), British landscape painter
- Tim Bowler, English writer for young adults
- Rob Bowler, Professional International DJ
