= Bowler =

Bowler may refer to:

== Places ==
=== United States ===
- Bowler Hill, Missouri
- Bowler, Montana
- Bowler, Virginia
- Bowler, Wisconsin

=== Other places ===
- Bowler Rocks, a group of rocks off the north coast of Greenwich Island, Antarctica

== Sports ==
- Bowler (cricket), a cricketer who delivers the ball to an opposing batsman
- Bowler (ten-pin), someone participating in the sport of bowling

== Other ==
- Bowler hat, a hard felt hat with a rounded crown
- Bowler (surname), an English surname
- Bowler (TV series), a 1973 British television series and spin off of The Fenn Street Gang
- Bowler Communications System, a protocol for controlling CNC machines
- Bowler Offroad, a maker of offroad vehicles
- Bowler, in marbles, a 7/8 inch (22 mm) marble
- James "Lord Bowler" Lonefeather, a fictional character in The Adventures of Brisco County, Jr.
- Bowler, a creature featured in Dungeons & Dragons
- Bowler, a troop featured in Clash of Clans and Clash Royale

== See also ==
- Bowl (disambiguation)
- Bowling (disambiguation)
- John Bowler (disambiguation)
- Peter Bowler (disambiguation)
- Thomas Bowler (disambiguation)
