= American football on Thanksgiving =

American tradition

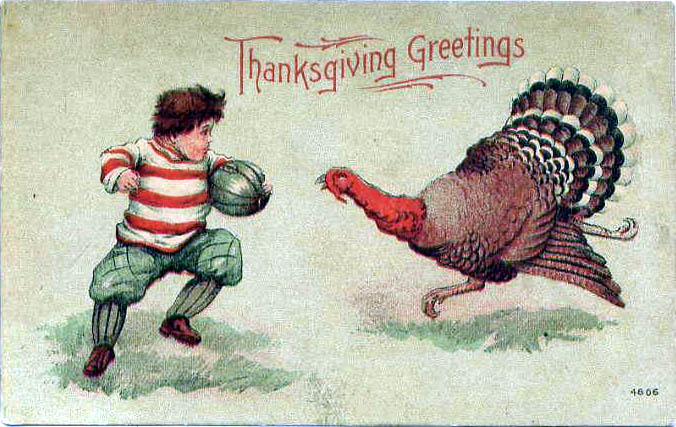
Thanksgiving postcard showing a turkey and football player, c. 1900

American football is one of the many traditions in American culture that is associated with Thanksgiving Day. Virtually every level of football, from amateur and high school to college and the NFL (including the CFL on Canadian Thanksgiving), plays football on Thanksgiving Day (Thursday) or the immediately following holiday weekend (Friday, Saturday, and Sunday).

== History ==
The first Thanksgiving Day football game took place in Philadelphia, on Thanksgiving Day of 1869, less than two weeks after Rutgers defeated Princeton in New Brunswick, New Jersey, in what is widely recognized as the first intercollegiate football game in the United States, and only six years after Abraham Lincoln declared the first fixed national Thanksgiving holiday in 1863.

On November 17, 1869, the Philadelphia Evening Telegraph published the following announcement: "Foot Ball: A foot-ball match between twenty-two players of the Young America Cricket Club and the Germantown Cricket Club will take place on Thanksgiving Day at 12 1/2 o'clock, on the grounds of the Germantown Club." The proximity of Philadelphia to both Rutgers and Princeton invites speculation that this game may have been played under similar rules and perhaps involved some of the same participants, or at least people familiar with the game played at Rutgers, and a second match at Princeton, earlier that month.

Princeton played Yale in the New York City area on Thanksgiving Day from 1876 through 1881. The Thanksgiving Day football game became an institutionalized fixture of organized football in 1882, when the Intercollegiate Football Association determined to hold an annual collegiate championship game in New York City on Thanksgiving Day between the two leading teams in the association. Previously, the 'Champion' was to be determined by a team's records over the entire season against all members of the association. For at least the three previous years, the championship had been a matter of dispute as a result of Yale and Princeton playing to scoreless ties on three Thanksgiving Day games in a row.

On November 25, 1897, American students of the École des Beaux-Arts and the Académie Julian played a game in Paris, France. This is considered the first American football game ever played in Europe.

The tradition of playing football games on Thanksgiving continues to the present-day. At the high school level, the tradition is declining rapidly as schools drop their Thanksgiving games and shorten their regular season in favor of playoff tournaments and allowing players to focus on winter sports such as basketball.

== Professional football ==
Professional football teams and leagues have played on Thanksgiving from the start, with pro leagues and teams having played on Thanksgiving since the 1890s. It carried over when Buffalo and Rochester, two members of the New York Pro Football League (NYPFL) which had held its championship on Thanksgiving 1919, and the Ohio League, which traditionally held its marquee matchups on Thanksgiving, combined into the NFL upon its founding in 1920, and as such, the NFL has played on Thanksgiving ever since. The Detroit Lions and the Dallas Cowboys have played home games on Thanksgiving since 1934 and 1966, respectively, in a traditional series of NFL games. Beginning in 2006, the NFL added a third game on Thanksgiving night with a rotating host team.

The rival American Football League also played on Thanksgiving in the 1960s, as did the All-America Football Conference in the 1940s and the original AFL in 1926.

In the Canadian Football League, where games are played on Canadian Thanksgiving, the CFL hosts two games in the Thanksgiving Day Classic; it is one of only two weeks each year in which the CFL plays on a Monday, the other being the Labour Day Classic. The difference between the Thanksgiving and Labour Day games is that the Thanksgiving Day games do not have the same matchups each year; however, like its American counterpart, one of the games has a regular host (in the CFL's case, the Montreal Alouettes). Coincidentally, both the Grey Cup, the CFL's championship game, and the Vanier Cup, the championship of Canadian college football, are both traditionally played on the fourth weekend in November, which amounts to the week before or the week after American Thanksgiving.

The World Football League originally planned to hold its 1974 championship game, World Bowl 1, the day after Thanksgiving in 1974; the business failures of the 1974 season led to the league reorganizing the playoff structure and pushing the World Bowl one week back (although the WFL regularly played on Thursdays during the regular season, it instead split its semifinals between the day before Thanksgiving and the day after). Had the United States Football League completed its move to autumn for the 1986 season, it would have played one of its games on Thanksgiving (a game featuring the Tampa Bay Bandits at the Memphis Showboats was scheduled for that night), but the league suspended operations prior to the season and, even if it had survived, the Bandits went bankrupt before the season would have been played. Similarly, the United Football League, which began play in 2009, held its first two UFL championship games over Thanksgiving weekend; both the truncated 2011 UFL season and the 2012 UFL season were cut short well before the Thanksgiving holiday due to financial shortfalls. The Fall Experimental Football League had scheduled its championship for the day before Thanksgiving Day 2014, in Brooklyn, but the game was cancelled after the season was shortened.

== College football ==
Thanksgiving weekend historically marks the end of the college football regular season, before conference championships and bowl games begin play in December (the Army–Navy Game is the lone exception). Today, this is only true for the top-level NCAA Division I Football Bowl Subdivision, where it has become a tradition to play a fierce rival on the last week of the regular season. At levels below the Bowl Subdivision, the NCAA begins its championship tournaments either on Thanksgiving weekend (for the Division I FCS championship) or the week before (in the cases of Divisions II and III; the NAIA, a separate body, also begins its tournament at that time). Other college football sanctioning bodies end their seasons well before Thanksgiving.

The University of Kansas and University of Missouri played the first of nineteen consecutive Thanksgiving Day football games in Kansas City, Missouri in 1892. After new conference rules that required all games to be played on college campuses, the Thanksgiving Day tradition was temporarily suspended in 1911, but then reinstituted in spurts starting in 1916 and continuing through the 1940s.

The University of Michigan made it a tradition to play annual Thanksgiving games, holding 19 such games from 1885 to 1905. The Thanksgiving Day games between Michigan and the Chicago Maroons in the 1890s have been erroneously cited as "The Beginning of Thanksgiving Day Football." Since the Maroons no longer play at the Division I level, the Wolverines now play their modern-day archrivals, the Ohio State Buckeyes, during Thanksgiving weekend. Yale and Princeton began an annual tradition of playing against each other on Thanksgiving Day starting in 1876. From 1945 to 1956, the Burley Bowl pitted two small colleges against each other in an unofficial bowl game.

From 1894 to 1953, Case Tech Rough Riders and Western Reserve University Red Cats played each other on Thanksgiving, playing at Cleveland Stadium from the time of its opening in 1931. The two schools merged in 1970.

In the Ivy League, the Penn Quakers football squad regularly hosted the Cornell Big Red football team on Thanksgiving Day from 1895 to 1938, at its peak selling over 70,000 seats at Franklin Field. The series was interrupted by the Franksgiving dispute in 1939, and attempts to revive the series thereafter met with mixed success and declining attendance by 1965, prompting Penn to surrender its permanent hosting; the last Penn–Cornell Thanksgiving game was in 1989.

A college football game between Alabama State University and Tuskegee University, has been played on Thanksgiving Day annually from 1924 to 2012 and again since 2016; as such, it has historically been known as the "Turkey Day Classic". It is also the oldest black college football classic, since the two colleges first played each other in 1901. Tuskegee University pulled out of the contest after 2012 (they were replaced by Stillman College in the 2013 contest), and Alabama State did the same from 2013 to 2015, deciding to move its homecoming to the Saturday before Thanksgiving; in both cases, the NCAA football tournaments prompted the schools to move the end of their seasons to before Thanksgiving so that they would be able to compete for the national championship should they qualify. The establishment of the Celebration Bowl for historically black schools allowed the Turkey Day Classic to resume; it was held against conference rivals Mississippi Valley State and Prairie View A&M in 2018 and 2019, respectively. Another popular black college football classic played on Thanksgiving weekend is the Bayou Classic between Grambling State University and Southern University, which is held the Saturday after Thanksgiving; for the 2017 season only, because of a hurricane earlier in the season, the Labor Day Classic between Texas Southern and Prairie View A&M was played on Thanksgiving weekend, and the two teams voluntarily agreed to hold that Classic on the same weekend in 2018. Alabama State, Mississippi Valley State, Prairie View A&M, Texas Southern, Southern and Grambling are all members of the Southwestern Athletic Conference.

In 2024 and 2025, the American Athletic Conference held the rights to the lone Bowl Subdivision game on Thanksgiving, with both games hosted by the Memphis Tigers football squad. In contrast to most Thanksgiving weekend games that have featured fixed rivalries, the Tigers opted to rotate opponents in hopes of securing a quality matchup for the time slot: the 2024 game featured the Tigers against Tulane and the 2025 game will host Navy, both teams (along with Memphis) being in the upper echelon of the American standings at the time. For 2026, the West Texas Championship Saddle Trophy game between the Texas Tech Red Raiders and Texas Christian Horned Frogs, both of the Big 12 Conference, was chosen as the lone Bowl Subdivision game for Thanksgiving night.

Other prominent college football rivalries that take place over Thanksgiving weekend include:

- Auburn Tigers vs. Alabama Crimson Tide (the Iron Bowl)
- Ole Miss Rebels vs. Mississippi State Bulldogs (the Battle of the Golden Egg, played on Thanksgiving night from 1998 to 2003 and 2017 to 2019)
- LSU Tigers vs. Arkansas Razorbacks (the Battle for the Golden Boot), through 2013
  - Arkansas has played Missouri on Thanksgiving weekend since 2014
- Georgia Bulldogs vs. Georgia Tech Yellow Jackets (Clean, Old-Fashioned Hate)
- BYU Cougars vs. Utah Utes (the Holy War, to 2010, again in 2018)
- Colorado Buffaloes vs. Nebraska Cornhuskers (Colorado–Nebraska football rivalry, through 2010)
  - Colorado Buffaloes vs. Utah Utes (Rumble in the Rockies, since 2011)
  - Nebraska Cornhuskers vs. Iowa Hawkeyes (Heroes Game, since 2011)
- Oklahoma Sooners vs. Oklahoma State Cowboys (the Bedlam Series through until 2023)
  - This game was played earlier in the season in 2017 and 2018
- Texas Longhorns vs. Texas A&M Aggies (the Lone Star Showdown, played on Thanksgiving from 2008 until its end in 2011, resumed on Thanksgiving weekend in 2024, also played on Thanksgiving many other times prior to 2008)
  - Until 2015, Texas hosted a game on Thanksgiving night every year; after the end of the Lone Star Showdown, Texas played against TCU (for the Chancellor's Spurs) in even-numbered years and against Texas Tech in odd-numbered years.
  - Texas A&M played LSU during Thanksgiving week beginning in 2014 until 2023, with the game being played on Thanksgiving night in 2014 and 2016. (see also: LSU–Texas A&M football rivalry)
    - LSU plays Oklahoma on Thanksgiving weekend starting in 2024 with the Sooners move to the SEC
- Florida Gators vs. Florida State Seminoles (the Sunshine Showdown)
- Notre Dame Fighting Irish vs. USC Trojans (the Jeweled Shillelagh); rivalry is played every year but only scheduled for Thanksgiving weekend when Southern Cal hosts; Southern Cal has hosted on Thanksgiving in even-numbered years since the 1960s. In odd-numbered years, USC typically plays UCLA, while Notre Dame typically plays Stanford.
- Clemson Tigers vs. South Carolina Gamecocks (the Palmetto Bowl)
- Virginia Tech Hokies vs. Virginia Cavaliers (the Commonwealth Cup, erratically scheduled prior to 2006)
  - Virginia Tech used to play VMI (the Military Classic of the South) on Thanksgiving Day in Roanoke, VA annually from 1913 to 1969, and at Victory Stadium from 1942. The series continued until 1971 in Roanoke but on the following weekend.
  - Virginia was normally scheduled to play North Carolina (South's Oldest Rivalry) on Thanksgiving or the weekend afterward dating back to their second meeting in 1892. The game stopped being played that week starting in 1950.
- Kentucky Wildcats vs. Tennessee Volunteers (historically the Battle for the Beer Barrel; played annually but no longer on Thanksgiving weekend)
- Kentucky Wildcats vs. Louisville Cardinals (the Governor's Cup, moved to Thanksgiving weekend starting in 2014)
- University of South Florida vs. University of Central Florida (the War on I-4)
- Michigan Wolverines vs. Ohio State Buckeyes (The Game), played the Saturday after Thanksgiving.
- Arizona vs. Arizona State (Duel in the Desert), played the Friday or Saturday after Thanksgiving.
- Minnesota Golden Gophers vs. Wisconsin Badgers (Paul Bunyan's Axe)
- North Carolina Tar Heels vs. NC State Wolfpack (North Carolina–NC State football rivalry)
- Iowa State Cyclones vs. Kansas State Wildcats (Farmageddon, irregularly scheduled, sometimes Thanksgiving weekend)
- Army Black Knights vs. Navy Midshipmen (the Army–Navy Game; by 2006, it had moved one week, then eventually two weeks after Thanksgiving weekend beginning in 2009, to maintain its status as the last game of the college football regular season)

The frequent changing of conferences stemming from the early-2010s realignment of NCAA teams and conferences, along with a second wave of realignments in the 2020s, complicated the numerous rivalries that traditionally play Thanksgiving weekend.

While collegiate games have been played on Thanksgiving Day itself (with perhaps the most notable being the Nebraska-Oklahoma game of 1971), the majority of the current traditional Thanksgiving weekend college football games listed above are played on the Friday or Saturday after the holiday, in part to avoid conflicts with the NFL.

== High school football ==
High school football games played on Thanksgiving are often called a Turkey Day Game or a Turkey Bowl (not to be confused with Turkey bowling), as Americans typically eat turkeys on Thanksgiving, although the title varies with each game. Most commonly these games are between high school football rivalries although in many cases, when poor weather requires a shorter season, the game can be the culmination of league play among a high-school league, in which the winners of this game will be the league champions for the year. (Statewide playoffs were generally rare until the 1970s and 1980s, which allowed for longer regular seasons.) The custom dates back more than 100 years and is particularly prevalent in the Northeast. In most cases, games are contested with kickoff times as early as 9 a.m., allowing the participants to have the rest of the holiday off.

This list is sorted alphabetically, first by state, and then by school, with team leading the series listed first wherever possible. State and regional championship tournaments are listed ahead of rivalries. If the rivalry involves two states, the rivalry is listed under the school whose state comes first alphabetically (e.g. a New Jersey-Pennsylvania rivalry is listed under New Jersey).

=== California ===
San Jose Big Bone Game (no longer held on Thanksgiving)
The only Thanksgiving high school rivalry game to be played west of the state of Missouri, this game dates to 1943 and is played in San Jose, California, each Thanksgiving at 11 am. The game pits Abraham Lincoln High School against San Jose High School. The "Big Bone" in question is the femur of a cow that was retrieved from a butcher shop. Lincoln leads the series 38–24. The game is preceded the week prior with the "Little Bone Game", played between the two junior varsity teams. The game has been lopsided in its last years, with Lincoln winning the last 22 contests in a row through its final playing in 2019. After Lincoln opted to enter a statewide playoff tournament, it announced in 2021 it would no longer contest the game on Thanksgiving and instead move the contest to Labor Day.
San Francisco Turkey Bowl
Also in the San Francisco Bay Area, the Turkey Bowl in San Francisco dates back to 1924 and currently is played at Kezar Stadium each Thanksgiving at 11 am. The Turkey Bowl is the city's public high school championship game. Galileo High School has the most overall wins in the game (16) after breaking Abraham Lincoln High School's record four-game winning streak in 2009. Three times in the contest's 100-year history has the game been canceled: in 1963 because of the assassination of John F. Kennedy, in 2017 because of wildfires pushing the regular season and playoff schedule a week later, and 2020 due to the COVID-19 pandemic and related gathering restrictions in California.

=== Connecticut ===
Connecticut has at least 48 Thanksgiving games. Some of the better known ones are as follows:

Ansonia vs. Naugatuck
Ansonia High School and Naugatuck High School have played each other since 1900. Ansonia leads the series, 72–35–11, as of 2016. The game is, as of 2015, broadcast on WATR.
Branford v. East Haven
In the battle of two gritty, working-class Italian American towns each with a buzzing mascot, the Branford Hornets meet the East Haven Yellow Jackets in a rivalry that is must-see along the shoreline if for nothing more than East Haven marching band halftime performance.
Bristol Central vs. Bristol Eastern
Bristol Central High School and Bristol Eastern High School have played each other since 1959 in the annual "Battle for the Bell."
Darien vs. New Canaan
The Darien vs. New Canaan Thanksgiving matchup involves the Darien Blue Wave and the New Canaan Rams, who have been rivals since their first match in 1928. The game has been played on Thanksgiving since 1994, with New Canaan leading the Turkey Bowl series 14-9-1 and the overall series 51–38–2. Recently, New Canaan went undefeated for 11 straight years from 2002 to 2011, but Darien won 5 straight from 2012 to 2016. The 2010 matchup, marred by the arrests of three Darien starters the day before (all three did not play), was won by New Canaan 42–14. Due to the large crowds that attend the game (up to 10,000 people), it is usually played either in New Canaan's Dunning Stadium (which needs to be temporarily expanded in order to fit the crowds) or Stamford's Boyle Stadium, which can hold 10,000 spectators.
Fairfield Ludlowe vs. Fairfield Warde
The two in-town rivals meet annually on Thanksgiving, often drawing the largest crowds of the season for each team, including students, families, and various town officials. The history of Fairfield Thanksgiving football dates back to 1975, when the two schools (then known as the Roger Ludlowe Flying Tigers and the Andrew Warde Crimson Eagles) fought to a 28-6 Warde victory. The rivalry endured a hiatus from 1985 to 2004, when the two schools merged, until they split again in 2005 to renew the matchup with a 20–14 victory for the newly named Ludlowe Falcons over the Warde Mustangs.
Guilford vs. Daniel Hand (Madison)
Madison split out of what was East Guilford and since these two teams have begun playing annually Guilford has only won 7 of the match-ups, Guilford tends to be a below .500 team whereas Hand is typically a near perfect team. Hand is always favored, however Guilford always gets pumped up for this final game.
Hamden vs. Notre Dame West Haven
The annual Green Bowl game that takes place every Thanksgiving.
Hartford Public vs. Weaver
Played annually at Dillon Stadium in Hartford.
Norwich Free Academy vs. New London High School
Is both the nation's oldest rivalry in the nation had the most games (155), if mergers are counted with their predecessors. The first game in what is now Ye Olde Ball Game was played in 1875 between NFA and the Bulkeley School for Boys in New London and continued until 1951 when Bulkeley merged with Chapman Tech to become New London High. NFA leads the series, NFA leads series, 78–65–11.
Shelton vs. Derby
Shelton and Derby have played each other since 1904.
Staples vs. Greenwich
Stonington vs. Westerly, Rhode Island
Tied with NFA-New London for the most games (155) with Stonington leading Westerly 74-72–17 as of 2023. However, when strictly looking at Thanksgiving Turkey day games Westerly leads 50–44–9.
Wilbur Cross vs. Hillhouse
New Haven's two largest high schools, Hillhouse High School and Wilbur Cross High School, meet every Thanksgiving in the "Elm City Bowl".
Masuk vs. Newtown
This game has decided the winner of SWC championship the past two years, with Masuk winning by a combined score of 88–7.
Stratford vs. Bunnell
In town rivalry, annual attendance of 3,000 or more people. A number of players involved in this game have gone on to NFL careers. Including Marcus Easley and Mark Harrison
New Milford vs New Fairfield
Longtime rivals that have played each other for decades but have been playing each other on Thanksgiving morning since 2007. Winner of game is awarded the "Candlewood Cup" trophy which is named for the lake that separates the two towns. New Fairfield currently holds a 7–2 series lead on Thanksgiving.

=== District of Columbia ===
District championship game
The District of Columbia Interscholastic Athletic Association holds its annual city high school championship game on Thanksgiving weekend. The Turkey Bowl has been a fixture since 1970.
Gonzaga vs. St. John's
An annual game occurs between Gonzaga College High School and St. John's College High School, two Catholic high schools in the Washington, D.C. area. The rivalry dates to 1893.

=== Florida ===
Plant v. Hillsborough (no longer played on Thanksgiving)
Hillsborough High School and Henry B. Plant High School, two teams in Tampa, Florida, used to play a rivalry game on Thanksgiving until 1974, after which the state playoffs forced the teams to move the game into season. At its peak the game was held at Tampa Stadium.

=== Georgia ===
Savannah v. Benedictine Military School (no longer played on Thanksgiving)
An annual Thanksgiving Day game between Savannah High School and Benedictine Military School was played at what is now Grayson Stadium from 1927 until 1959.

=== Maine ===
Maine has only one Thanksgiving football game

Portland High School vs. Deering High School
This is the only annual Thanksgiving game played in Maine. First held in 1911, this annual game pits cross town rivals Deering High School Rams and Portland High School Bulldogs against each other at Fitzpatrick Stadium

=== Maryland ===
Maryland is home to two of the oldest rivalries nationally.

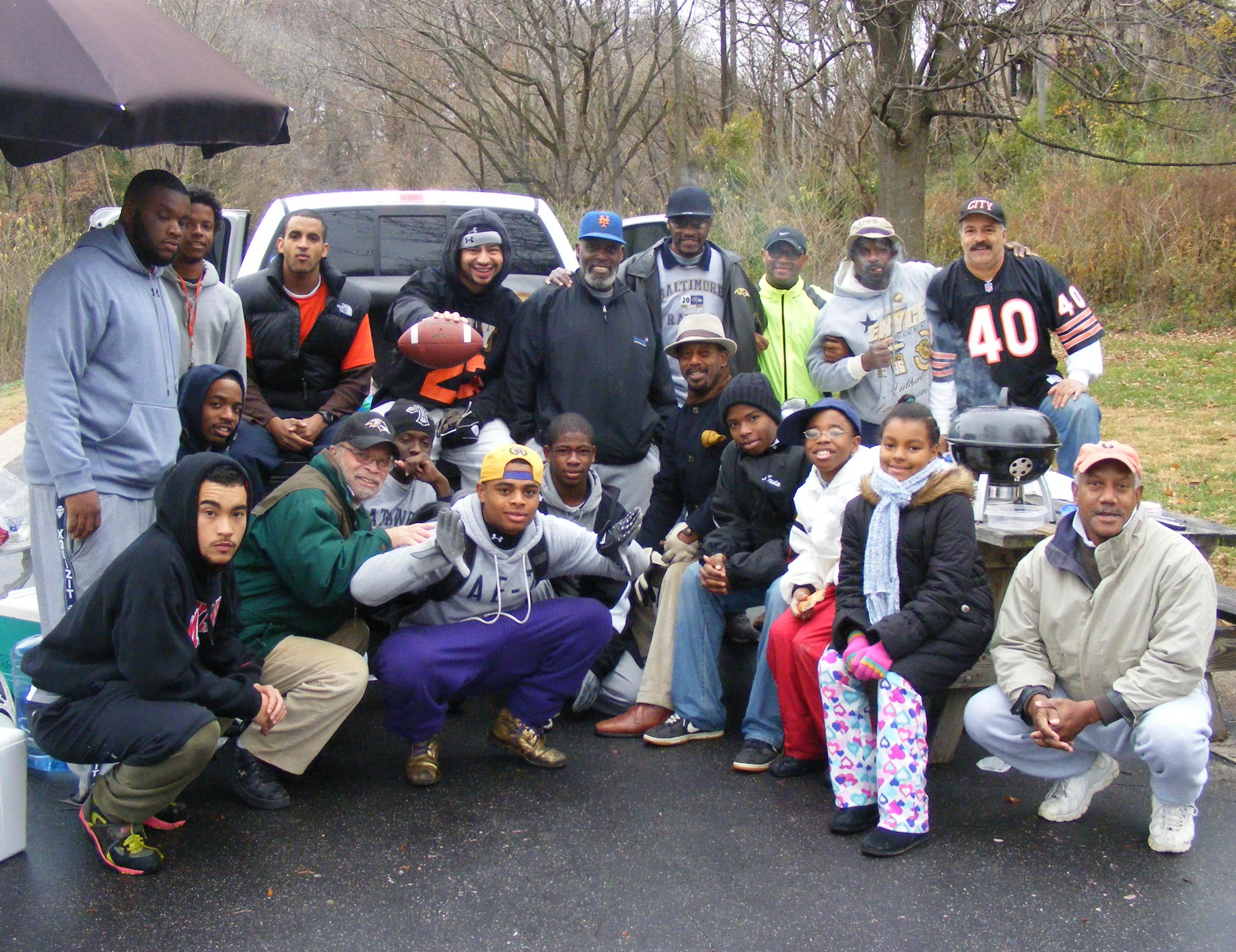
Participants in a Baltimore area TurkeyBowl included attorney Warren Brown and Curt Anderson

Loyola Blakefield vs. Calvert Hall College
Calvert Hall College and Loyola Blakefield, both private high schools in Towson, Maryland have played an annual football game on Thanksgiving Day known as the "Turkey Bowl." The 100-year-old tradition is the oldest continuous Catholic prep-school football rivalry in the United States. The game is currently held at Johnny Unitas Stadium at Towson University (However, Previously played at M&T Bank Stadium), home of the Baltimore Ravens. As of the 2023 edition, The Loyola Dons have the overall lead over the Calvert Hall Cardinals in the Turkey Bowl, with a record of 53–44–8. It is televised on the local ABC affiliate, WMAR 2.
Baltimore Polytechnic Institute (Poly) vs. Baltimore City College (City)
In 1889, the game was played between City and Poly, then located on Courtland Street just a short distance from City. This led to one of the longest continuous public high school American football rivalry in the nation. In the early 1900s the game was played on Thanksgiving Day and when Memorial Stadium was built in 1954 the game was played there until the stadium was demolished in 2000. The games played at Memorial stadium during the 1960s drew an average of 25,000 fans. In 1965, 27,500 fans saw quarterback Kurt Schmoke and team captain Curt Anderson lead City to a 52–6 win over Poly. The Thanksgiving tradition ended in 1993 when both City and Poly joined the Maryland Public Secondary Schools Athletic Association which held its playoffs during the Thanksgiving week, requiring both schools to move their rivalry to a date three weeks earlier. The game is now played at M&T Bank Stadium, in downtown Baltimore the first week of November. Anderson (City) and Baltimore attorney Warren Brown (Poly) have kept the Turkey Day tradition alive between the two schools by sponsoring a flag football game at 9 am every Thanksgiving morning at Baltimore's Herring Run Park. For the past 30 years any former Poly student, football player or not, faces off against a team made up of former City students. Brown and Anderson no longer play, but their sons do.

=== Massachusetts ===
In Massachusetts, the Thanksgiving Day game is a tradition that brings out thousands of fans, including many alumni. A majority of schools in the state have their own traditional rival with a holiday game regardless of the outcomes of the regular season.

Abington vs. Whitman-Hanson
Abington High School and Whitman-Hanson Regional High School have faced off on Thanksgiving Day since 1910. The 100th meeting between these two schools was played at Whitman in 2010. Whitman-Hanson has won 57 of the one hundred games played.
Agawam vs. West Springfield
Since 1924, the two schools have met every year but 1949.
Algonquin vs. Westboro
Athol vs Ralph C Mahar Regional
The public high schools of Athol and Orange, MA first met on the football field in 1894. The rivalry has been continuous since 1944. Orange High School became Ralph C Mahar Regional School in 1957.
Andover vs. North Andover
Andover High School and North Andover High School will start playing each other again on thanksgiving in 2015 at North Andover. These two were thanksgiving rivals up to 1970 when the rivalry ended when North Andover switched leagues. This ended Andovers classic thanksgiving rivalry with Central Catholic High School. In which case Central winning the last battle in 2014.
Archbishop Williams vs. Cardinal Spelman
Ashland vs. Hopkinton
Attleboro vs. North Attleborough
Barnstable vs. Falmouth
Barnstable High School and Falmouth High School have played each other since 1895.
Bartlett (Webster) vs. Southbridge
These two schools are regular Thanksgiving rivals; their game is broadcast on WQVR.
Bellingham vs. Norton
Belmont vs. Watertown
Held on Thanksgiving morning for 104 years, the 2026 contest was controversially moved to the day before Thanksgiving to accommodate students' family obligations on the holiday. The game will return to Thanksgiving morning in 2027.k
Beverly vs. Salem
Salem High School and Beverly High School have played each other since 1891. The 100th meeting between the two schools in 1998 at Hurd Stadium attracted over 11,000 fans.
Durfee (Fall River) vs. New Bedford
New Bedford High School and B.M.C. Durfee of Fall River have contested this rivalry since 1893. WNBH currently holds broadcast rights. In 2026, this game moved to the Wednesday night before Thanksgiving and was scheduled to play at Fenway Park.
BC High vs. Catholic Memorial
Boston College High School vs. Catholic Memorial School rivalry, with both all-male schools drawing students from similar seas. The winner of the game wins the Pumpkin Trophy.
Bedford vs. Burlington
Braintree vs. Milton
Braintree High School and Milton High School have played each other on Thanksgiving since 1920. Milton leads 44–39–1.
Billerica vs. Chelmsford
Chelmsford High School and Billerica Memorial High School have faced off against each other annually since 1927.
Carver vs. Middleborough
Chicopee vs. Holyoke
Chicopee High School and Holyoke High School no longer play on thanksgiving. Chicopee plays Chicopee Comprehensive and Holyoke battles South Hadley.
Concord-Carlisle Regional vs. Lexington
Cohasset vs. Hull
Cohasset High School and Hull High School have played each other on Thanksgiving since the 1920s.
Dennis-Yarmouth vs. Nauset Regional
Dedham vs. Norwood
Dover-Sherborn vs. Medfield
Boston English vs. Boston Latin
The rivalry between English High School of Boston and Boston Latin School dates to 1887. It is played annually at Harvard Stadium.
Fairhaven vs. Dartmouth
Fitchburg vs. Leominster
Leominster High School and Fitchburgh High School have played since 1894. As of 2021, it has been contested on Thanksgiving 125 times, out of 140 total matches.
Franklin vs. King Philip Regional High School
Georgetown vs. Manchester-Essex Regional High School
Gloucester vs. Danvers
Greenfield vs. Turners Falls Regional
They have faced each other every Thanksgiving since 1926. As of 2019, Turners Falls suspended its football program and Greenfield now host Turners Falls Regional along with Mohawk Trail Regional and Pioneer Valley Regional in a 4 team cooperate.
Hamilton-Wenham vs. Ipswich
Haverhill vs. Lowell
This game is one of the few to be broadcast live. It is carried on radio, and online, by WCAP, Lowell's radio station.
Longmeadow vs. East Longmeadow
Longmeadow High School and East Longmeadow High School
Lawrence vs. Central Catholic
Lynnfield vs. North Reading
Lynnfield High School and North Reading High School
Lynn English vs. Lynn Classical
Inter-city High School rivalry between the two Lynn public high schools

Marlborough vs. Hudson
Marlborough High School and Hudson High School have played since 1904.
Medford vs. Malden
This rivalry has been contested since 1889.
Medway vs. Millis
Melrose vs. Wakefield
Minuteman Tech vs. Keefe Tech
Traditionally Minuteman Tech played Mystic Charter on Thanksgiving. When Mystic closed its football program 2019, Minuteman and Keefe started their rivalry in 2021.
Natick vs. Framingham
Needham vs. Wellesley
Since 1882, the Rockets and Raiders have been playing in the oldest public school football rivalry in the country.
Newburyport vs. Amesbury
These two teams have played each other 107 times as of 2021 with Newburyport holding the edge 56–42–9.
Newton North vs. Brookline
These two teams have been duking it out on Turkey Day since 1894, and is one of the oldest traditions in Massachusetts. As of 2021, Newton North leads the rivalry 68–54–6.
Newton South vs. Lincoln-Sudbury
Old Colony RVT vs. Tri-County RVT.
Pentucket Regional vs. Triton Regional
Teams have played since 1971. Pentucket has won 36 of the 54 contests, including on the way to winning the Super Bowl in 1999. There has been only 1 tie.
Plymouth North vs. Plymouth South
The "Battle for the Rock" is particularly significant for taking place between the two high schools in Plymouth, Massachusetts, the site of the original Plymouth Colony where the Pilgrims landed in 1620; it coincides with Plymouth's America's Hometown Thanksgiving Celebration. It is in its 29th playing as of 2025.
Quincy vs. North Quincy
This game has brought the people of Quincy out since 1932.
Seekonk vs. Dighton-Rehoboth
St. John's Prep vs. Xaverian Brothers High School
One of the premier football rivalries in all of New England, with Xaverian leading the 52-game series 30-22. A perennial power struggle, the teams often meet on Thanksgiving and in the MIAA Division 1 state championship, with Xaverian defeating St. John's 41-35 in the 2025 D1 state final.
Stoneham vs. Reading "The Turkey Bowl"
Teams have played since 1899. Reading leads the series 69–27–8.
Stoughton vs. Canton
Teams have played each since 1926, with Stoughton currently leading 54-45-4 as of the 2021 season. In 2026, this contest moved to the Tuesday before Thanksgiving at Fenway Park.
Taunton vs. Milford
Tewksbury vs. Wilmington
Tewksbury High first played Wilmington High in football back in 1935
Wayland vs. Weston
These two teams have played each other 88 times as of 2021. Wayland leads the series 55–30–3.
Westwood vs. Holliston
Winchester vs. Woburn
Winchester High School and Woburn Memorial High School's football teams have played each other 120 times since their first meeting in 1891 in one of the oldest rivalries in the country, one that is largely a friendly one. Winchester leads the all-time 55–53–12. Interestingly, six of the twelve ties have been scoreless, occurring in 1911, 1929, 1931, 1932, 1935, and 1965.

=== Michigan ===
Michigan High School Athletic Association State Championships
The state's high school football championships fall on Black Friday and the Saturday after Thanksgiving at Ford Field in Detroit. This coincides with the Detroit Lions' annual Thanksgiving Day game (see below). Eight championship games are played, one for each division (Division 1–8). Prior to the institution of state playoffs in 1975, many schools played rivalry games on Thanksgiving Day or the Friday following. A very few schools would play Thanksgiving Saturday, but this was rare due to efforts to avoid conflicts with the Michigan-Ohio State college game which historically dominated sporting attention in the state.
Adrian High School Alumni
Every Black Friday, the alumni of Adrian High School's varsity football program and other athletic teams meet at the center of the school track for an annual battle for (touch)football supremacy. This game has happened annually since November 1999.

=== Missouri ===
Show-Me Bowl
The state championships of Missouri high school football are held on the Friday and Saturday following Thanksgiving under the name "Show Me Bowl." There are seven games, one to decide the championship for each class, ranging from "Class 1" to "Class 6" and an eight-man football class. Held at the Dome at America's Center in St. Louis until that stadium's primary tenant (the Rams) abandoned the stadium in 2016, future versions of the Show-Me Bowl will be held at rotating venues, with Plaster Sports Complex on the campus of Missouri State University hosting the 2016 contest and Faurot Field on the campus of the University of Missouri hosting in 2017; the eight-man class will from that point forward be held at a separate site.
Webster Groves vs. Kirkwood Turkey Day Game
The contest between Kirkwood High School's Pioneers and Webster Groves High School's Statesmen, two teams based in the suburbs of St. Louis, has traditionally been played on Thanksgiving since 1907.
Excelsior Springs Mineral Water Bowl (no longer a high school game or played on Thanksgiving)
From 1948 to 1951, Excelsior Springs High School hosted other high school teams at its campus on Thanksgiving. As the state of Missouri did not officially sanction the contest out of concern for student-athletes' well-being, the event was forcibly canceled in 1951. These four games served as the beginning of the Mineral Water Bowl, which in 1954 was switched to a small college football bowl game that continued to be played, in December, each year in Excelsior Springs through 2019.

=== New Hampshire ===
Manchester city championship (Turkey Bowl)
Gill Stadium in Manchester, New Hampshire hosts an annual turkey bowl between the city's two top ranked teams in the regular season. Manchester Central High School has appeared as the opponent in all but seven of the 38 contests played through 2019, with the matchup of Central against Trinity being the most frequent to appear.

=== New Jersey ===
As of 2025, twelve Thanksgiving Day football games were still played in New Jersey. New Jersey's school athletics association had previously offered more flexibility to schools who had traditional Thanksgiving Day rivalries but had reached the playoffs, allowing those teams to reschedule those playoff games to avoid short turnarounds; the state rescinded those accommodations in 2026 and cemented its state championships on Thanksgiving weekend. The below lists current and historical examples:

Atlantic City vs. Holy Spirit
Asbury Park vs. Neptune
Known as the "'Hood Championship," this contest, dating to the 1920s, was canceled in 2017, following years of escalating tensions and threats of legitimate violence for that year's contest. It eventually resumed but would be moved to the weekend before Thanksgiving.
Hamilton High School West vs. Steinert High School
Played annually on Thanksgiving Day since 1958 as this is the crosstown rivalry in Hamilton Township (Mercer County). The game in odd numbered years is played at Hamilton West, and at Steinert during even numbered years, the game traditionally starts at 10:30 a.m., and is streamed on WBCB.
Hackensack High School vs. Teaneck High School
The teams have met 90 times with Hackensack holding a 67–23 series lead. The rivals have played annually every Thanksgiving morning since 1931 with the exception of 2020.
Don Bosco Prep vs. Paramus Catholic / Saint Joseph Regional High School
Don Bosco Preparatory High School in Ramsey, one of the top high school football programs in the United States, and Paramus Catholic High School were traditional Thanksgiving rivals until 2013. Fox Sports 1 carried the 2013 contest nationwide. Don Bosco Prep instead planned to host Saint Joseph Regional High School on Thanksgiving in 2014 (the contest was postponed to the following Saturday in any event, due to inclement weather). Due to numerous scheduling snafus, Don Bosco did not schedule any Thanksgiving game for 2015.
Dumont vs. Tenafly
With 95 overall meetings, this is the oldest and most played high school football rivalry in Bergen County, NJ. The Tenafly Tigers lead the all-time series against the Dumont Huskies 56–36–3, but Dumont has won eleven consecutive meetings, most recently in the 2025 Thanksgiving Day "Turkey Bowl." Dumont entered the 4th quarter leading 22-0, but needed to recover a late onside kick attempt by Tenafly to survive and win 28-20 after Tenafly's valiant 4th quarter comeback attempt came up short. The rivalry is a long-standing one, played nearly every year since 1922 and played annually on Thanksgiving since 1949 with the exception of 2020.
Phillipsburg vs. Easton, Pennsylvania
Phillipsburg High School and Easton High School have been playing each other since 1905 in a rivalry billed as The State Line Game. The first Thanksgiving Day meeting was in 1916 and the schools have played each other annually ever since. The winner of the game is presented with the Forks of the Delaware Trophy, as both schools are located from different states (Phillipsburg from NJ, Easton from PA) on opposite sides of the Delaware River. The game is played each year at Fisher Field located on the campus of Lafayette College as a neutral site. The game was previously nationally televised (the 2006 contest was carried on ESPN's High School Showcase); as of 2015, it is carried on radio by WEEX and televised by WFMZ-TV. A rematch of the 1993 Easton-Phillipsburg Thanksgiving contest was the inaugural game in Gatorade's REPLAY the Series on April 26, 2009.
Ridgewood vs. Paramus
Ridgewood High School and Paramus High School was played every Thanksgiving morning annually from 1984 to 2013. Paramus had played continuously every Thanksgiving from 1962 onward until deciding after the 2013 season not to partake in any more games on the holiday. The school determined that the contest interfered with their participation in the state championship and refused to compromise the integrity of the match by resting the starters.
East Orange vs. Barringer
East Orange High School and Barringer High School have played since 1897.
Emerson at Union Hill
The Turkey Game between Union Hill High School and Emerson High School ran from 1919 to 2007, after which the two rival schools merged into Union City High School. The rivalry concluded with the two schools exactly tied with a 40–40–9 record against each other. The game was held at Roosevelt Stadium in Union City, which is now located on the roof of the new Union City High School.
Millville vs. Vineland
The state's oldest, this rivalry has been contested since 1893, with Vineland leading the series 64–63–19, heading into the 2017 game. WMGM-TV carried the 2016 contest live, and the 2017 and 2018 contests were carried by WACP and sister station WSNJ; the game went unbroadcast in 2019.
Westfield vs. Plainfield
Westfield and Plainfield had been played from 1900 and celebrated its 100th game in 2005. It is now played at the start of the season due to postseason rankings.
Watchung Hills vs. Ridge
A game formally played the day before Thanksgiving, as the two rivals weren't in the same division for football. When they both became members of the same division in 2008, they began regular-season play. The venue alternated between the two schools' stadiums every year, with the last game in 2007 played at Ridge.
North Plainfield vs. South Plainfield
The game is played on Thanksgiving morning each year.
East Brunswick vs. Old Bridge
East Brunswick High School and Old Bridge High School compete annually in the Battle Of Route 18 football game. The rivalry began in 1994 when Cedar Ridge High School and Madison Central High School merged into Old Bridge High School, and has since played East Brunswick every year on Thanksgiving morning. The contests alternates home field advantage each year, and each side awards an offensive and defensive MVP.
Palmyra High School and Burlington City High School
have played on Thanksgiving since the 1930s; the rivalry began in 1908, and is one of the oldest high school rivalries in the Delaware Valley. Palmyra leads the series 52–45–12.
Salem vs. Woodstown
Played Thanksgiving Day every year at 10:30, started in 1911, next year will be the 100th anniversary.
Madison vs. Millburn (abolished)
Alternated fields each year. The mayors typically made bets, with the losing team providing the winners with a platter of sloppy joes. Also, the loser must wash the other team's cars without pants on. This contest ended after the 2017 competition.
Red Bank Catholic vs. Rumson Fair-Haven
Game played annually since 1921. Presents Peninsula Trophy to winner
New Providence vs. Berkeley Heights
This rivalry has been contested for only a few years, but is very popular in the surrounding areas of New Providence, Summit, and Berkeley Heights.
Middletown South vs. Middletown North
Middletown High School South and Middletown High School North varsity teams play annually, with the home team alternating every year. 2010 marked the 35th game played between the two schools, with Middletown South beating Middletown North 20–7. Middletown South leads the rivalry with a record of 23–11–1 over Middletown North.
Montclair v. Bloomfield
Montclair and Bloomfield met annually on Thanksgiving on and off from 1922 to 2017. The 1957 contest was notable for being televised nationwide, via the remains of the DuMont Television Network in a rare color telecast with Chris Schenkel on play-by-play.
Reselle v. Roselle Park
Roselle and Roselle Park competed against each other in 106 contests until the contest was discontinued following the 2025 event. It was the last such Thanksgiving football game still played in Union County.
Toms River HS South vs Lakewood High School
Shawnee High School vs Lenape High School
Absegami High School vs Oakcrest High School
Rancocas Valley Regional High School vs Burlington Township High School
Haddonfield Memorial High school vs Haddon Heights High School;

=== New York ===
State championship weekend
The New York State Public High School Athletic Association, which sanctions all public high school football in the state, holds its statewide football championships over Thanksgiving weekend at the Carrier Dome in Syracuse. Five divisions (ranging from the largest schools outside the five major cities to the smallest districts) each have their own state title decided on the Saturday after Thanksgiving. Buffalo Public Schools, representing the second-largest city in the state, joined the NYSPHSAA beginning in 2009, allowing them to contend for state championships but discontinuing their local Thanksgiving Day city championship (see below).
Buffalo Harvard Cup (discontinued)
In Western New York, Thanksgiving was the day of the annual Harvard Cup, the city of Buffalo's high school football championship game. It ran for 106 years. Games were held at All-High Stadium on the campus of Bennett High School in Buffalo and broadcast on local radio station WJJL. However, the Harvard Cup was discontinued after the 2009 season when Buffalo Public Schools joined the NYSPHSAA.
Fordham Prep vs. Xavier High School
The Xavier/Fordham Prep annual "Turkey Bowl" is one of the oldest high school football rivalries in New York history. Their very first game against one another took place in the late 1800s when the game was called due to darkness and ended in a tie. Xavier and Fordham Prep used to play many of their famed Thanksgiving Day "Turkey Bowl" Games at Manhattan's Polo Grounds until it was demolished following the construction of Shea Stadium in the borough of Queens. For many years, the game was played in Downing Stadium (now Icahn Stadium) on Randall's Island or on the campus of Fordham University in the Bronx. Most recently, in years Fordham has the home-field advantage, the game is played at Jack Coffey Field on the campus of Fordham University. When Xavier has the advantage, the game is played at the Aviator Sports and Events Center on the grounds of Floyd Bennett Field, part of the Gateway National Recreation Area in Brooklyn.
White Plains Turkey Bowl (discontinued)
This game between the Catholic high school Archbishop Stepinac High School and public school White Plains High School was played continuously from 1971 to 2012; White Plains High School had played other teams from around the United States as an invitational contest from 1932 to 1970. The game was traditionally played at a "neutral" field in White Plains, 10,000-seat Parker Stadium; the last five contests were held at Loucks Field on the campus of White Plains High School. White Plains, being a public school, forfeits any regional consolation playoff appearance it may have earned, due to a limit of 10 games for high school football teams in the NYSPHSAA, but does not have to forfeit its appearance in the state championship tournament. The game nonetheless had to be canceled if Stepinac advanced to their respective state championship game or White Plains won a section champions; this did not happen until 2013, when White Plains won a Section 1 title, and it happened again in 2014 and 2015 when Stepinac advanced to the Catholic State Championship both years; despite the repeated cancellations, the schools insisted the series would continue. A change in the state Catholic championship tournament, which opened a bye week during Thanksgiving weekend between the semifinals and the championship, allowed Stepinac to play the game in 2016 and continue to contest for the championship. Prior to the 2017 season, White Plains announced it would no longer play in the Turkey Bowl to allow its players to focus on winter sports, ending an over 90-year tradition of Thanksgiving football in Westchester County, New York.
Mt. St. Michael vs. Cardinal Hayes
Bronx Turkey Bowl: Mount St. Michael High School vs. Cardinal Hayes High School. It's been a tradition for the last 66 years. Since 1942 Mount St. Michael and Cardinal Hayes have met on each Thanksgiving Day a storied CHSFL rivalry showdown.
Iona Prep vs. New Rochelle (discontinued)
Played on Thanksgiving from 1949 to 2002, this rivalry contest was televised on New York City television, first by WABC-TV, then WPIX. As with the White Plains contest, New Rochelle's advancing to the state championship in 2003 and 2004 was the primary reason for the contest's abolition.
Yonkers vs. Gorton (discontinued)
The two schools were the first to play on Thanksgiving in Westchester County from the mid-1920s until 1984.
Roosevelt vs. Saunders (discontinued)
Another matchup in the city of Yonkers also took place from the mid-1920s to 1984. Roosevelt High School withdrew from the contest after the 1984 game, in which the team won the state title but was then upset in the Thanksgiving game.

=== Pennsylvania ===
Each year, WIP-FM hosts the Turkey Bowl, where Philadelphia area schools can enter to have their rivalry game played on Thanksgiving Day and broadcast live on the station by Joe DeCamara and Jon Ritchie, the hosts of the station's morning show. The station holds a fan vote to determine which rivalry game will be played, and the winning schools receive $3,000 each for their athletic departments.

As of 2026, ten high school football games remain on Thanksgiving in Pennsylvania, most of them concentrated in the Lehigh and North Penn Valleys.

Abington vs. Cheltenham
Abington Senior High School and Cheltenham High School play every year on Thanksgiving morning, unless one of the two schools is in the playoffs. The two schools, representing Abington Township and Cheltenham Township, Pennsylvania, are less than 2 miles apart and have been playing since 1915. The rivalry is the fifth-oldest public school rivalry in Pennsylvania, and seventh oldest of all schools. As of 2013, Abington holds the lead, 54–33–6.
Catasauqua vs. Northampton
Catasauqua High School and Northampton High School play a non-league game against each other every Thanksgiving dating back to 1925. The two schools are no longer within the same league, and thus the game is not sanctioned and does not count as a win/loss for official standings with regard to playoff consideration within the Pennsylvania Interscholastic Athletic Association. The game is always considered to be Homecoming for Catasauqua, regardless of whether the game is played at home or away from their perspective.
Chichester vs. Sun Valley
These two high schools from Delaware County have played each other a total of 83 times, and now the rivals face each other every Thanksgiving. Sun Valley narrowly has more wins than Chichester as the series record is currently 42–41. Sun Valley has won the past three years.
East Stroudsburg vs. Stroudsburg
East Stroudsburg High School South (formerly East Stroudsburg High School) and Stroudsburg High School have been playing annually since 1945 and began their Turkey Day tradition in 1953. With the advent of district playoffs, the game was moved to the regular season for four years, then the schools agreed to play once during the season and again on Thanksgiving if neither team is in the playoffs. A little more than 2 miles separate these public high schools which allows the victor to walk home with the Little Brown Jug Trophy.
Emmaus vs. Whitehall (no longer played on Thanksgiving)
Emmaus High School and Whitehall High School played an annual game on Thanksgiving from 1927 until 1995. They still play each other annually, but the game is now contested during the regular season and not on Thanksgiving.
Hatboro-Horsham vs. Upper Moreland
Hatboro-Horsham High School and Upper Moreland High School play each other on Thanksgiving, alternating between each school as the home team. The rivalry game was first played in 1933.
Lancaster at York (discontinued)
From 1983 to 2005, the War of the Roses All-Star Game pitted a team of high school seniors from York County against either another York County team or a team from Lancaster on Thanksgiving morning, with the rosters consisting of players on teams who were not still in the playoffs. Declining sponsorship and Lancaster County's decision to withdraw from the contest led to its end after 2005. As of 2023, negotiations were ongoing to bring back the contest, which was the only one of its kind in the Susquehanna Valley.
Mount Carmel vs. Shamokin (no longer played on Thanksgiving)
Mount Carmel High School and Shamokin High School first played each other in 1893, and annually since 1934. They began playing each other on Thanksgiving in 1951. The rivalry continues, but the game is no longer contested on Thanksgiving and is instead played during the regular season.
Nazareth vs. Wilson (no longer played on Thanksgiving)
Nazareth High School and Wilson High School played annually on Thanksgiving morning from 1926 to 1975. From 1945 to 1968, the game was played at Easton's Cottingham Stadium as a neutral site, and from 1969 to 1973 it was played at Taylor Stadium on the campus of Lehigh University. In 1974 the game was played at Nazareth High School, and in 1975 it was played at Wilson High. The game has not been played on Thanksgiving since 1975 and the two schools have not met at all since 1993. Discussions between the two schools are in the works to renew this rivalry.
Northeast vs. Central
This game pits two schools from the city of Philadelphia, Northeast High School and Central High School, against each other; the rivalry dates to 1892. The Central Lancers won the most recent Thanksgiving game (2013) by defeating the Northeast Vikings 6–3 in overtime. The Vikings hold a narrow all-time edge on the Lancers, 56–52–10.
Archbishop Ryan vs. George Washington High School
This game is a Northeast Philadelphia classic which pits the Ryan Raiders against the Washington Eagles. The two teams have met every Thanksgiving morning which can often be viewed as a second homecoming as so many alumni come back to watch the game. As of 2014, the Archbishop Ryan Raiders have a record of 28-9-1 in the series.
Ridley vs. Interboro
Ridley High School and Interboro High School play each other on Thanksgiving, alternating between each school as the home team. November 28, 2013 will be the 45th Thanksgiving Day football game played between these two schools This game is not held in years in which either team is currently in the playoffs on Thanksgiving Day.
Pottsville vs. Reading (no longer played on Thanksgiving)
Pottsville High School and Reading High School have been playing each other since 1893, and played annually on Thanksgiving from 1923 to 1977. They no longer play on Thanksgiving, but still play each other during the regular season.
Pottstown vs. Owen J. Roberts
Pennridge vs. Quakertown

This rivalry game between Pennridge High School and Quakertown High School has been played on Thanksgiving morning since 1930. Carried on radio on WNPV until that station's shutdown.

Upper Darby vs. Haverford
Upper Darby High School and Haverford High School, two public schools that are located less than three miles apart, have contested a game since 1921.
South Philadelphia vs. Sts. Neumann-Goretti
South Philadelphia High School and Saints John Neumann and Maria Goretti Catholic High School,(formerly St. John Neumann, South Catholic) have been playing each other since 1934. They have played every Thanksgiving except since 1934 except in 2001, 2011, 2014 and 2025. South Philadelphia won the last meeting in 2013. Neumann Goretti leads the all time 55–20–3.

West Chester East vs. Henderson
West Chester East High School and Henderson High School (Pennsylvania) previously played on Thanksgiving Day or Thanksgiving Eve in addition to regular season meetings between the crosstown schools. A number of Thanksgiving games were held at Farrell Stadium of West Chester University. The last Thanksgiving meeting between the schools was played in 2005.

=== Rhode Island ===
Portsmouth vs. Middletown
The two teams have played every year since 1965 with Portsmouth leading the all-time series 26–2–16–2. It is broadcast on WADK.
East Providence vs. La Salle
South Kingstown Rebels vs. North Kingstown Skippers
West Warwick vs. Coventry
Barrington Eagles vs. Mount Hope Huskies (formerly Bristol)
Burrillville vs. Ponaganset
Central vs. Hope
Central Falls vs. Lincoln
Chariho vs. Exeter/West Greenwich
Classical vs. Mount Pleasant
Coventry vs. West Warwick
Cranston East vs. Cranston West
Cumberland vs. Woonsocket
Carried on radio by WOON, Woonsocket's full-service radio station.
East Greenwich vs. Narragansett
Hendricken vs. Toll Gate
North Providence vs. Smithfield Steelers vs Cowboys
North Smithfield vs. Scituate
Pilgrim vs. Warwick Veterans
Rogers vs. Tiverton
Saint Raphael vs. Tolman (no longer played on Thanksgiving)
This game was notable for being played at McCoy Stadium in Pawtucket, a venue primarily used for baseball. The two teams play their regular season games at a field adjacent to McCoy Stadium. The rivalry ended in 2001, after 73 years, but a Thanksgiving Eve game was still held inside the stadium each year; after McCoy Stadium's demolition in 2025, the game moved to its replacement, Centreville Bank Stadium. Currently Saint Raphael hosts Moses Brown School on the even number years and Tolman hosts Shea High School on the odd number years. Saint Raphael led the holiday series 38–31–4.
Westerly vs. Stonington (CT)

=== Texas ===
Jack Yates vs. Phillis Wheatley (abolished)
Played at Robertson Stadium on the site where TDECU Stadium now stands, the "Turkey Day Classic" between two schools in Houston, Texas was played from 1946 to 1966.

=== Virginia ===
Hampton vs. Newport News (abolished)
From 1907 to 1970, Hampton High School's Crabbers and Newport News High School's Typhoon faced off against each other in one of the Hampton Roads region's most heated high school football rivalries. The imposition of a state championship tournament, coupled with the federally-ordered closure of Newport News High School for the purpose of desegregation, brought an end to the rivalry.
Woodberry Forest vs. Episcopal
The longest-running high school football rivalry in the South takes place each year between Woodberry Forest and Episcopal High School of Alexandria, Virginia. The schools first played against each other in 1901 and have competed in over a hundred consecutive games. "The Game", as it is known, draws back many alumni and is considered the homecoming game for both schools. The 100th contest, which Woodberry won, took place in 2000, drew nearly 15,000 spectators, and was featured on ESPN.

== "Turkey Bowl" games ==
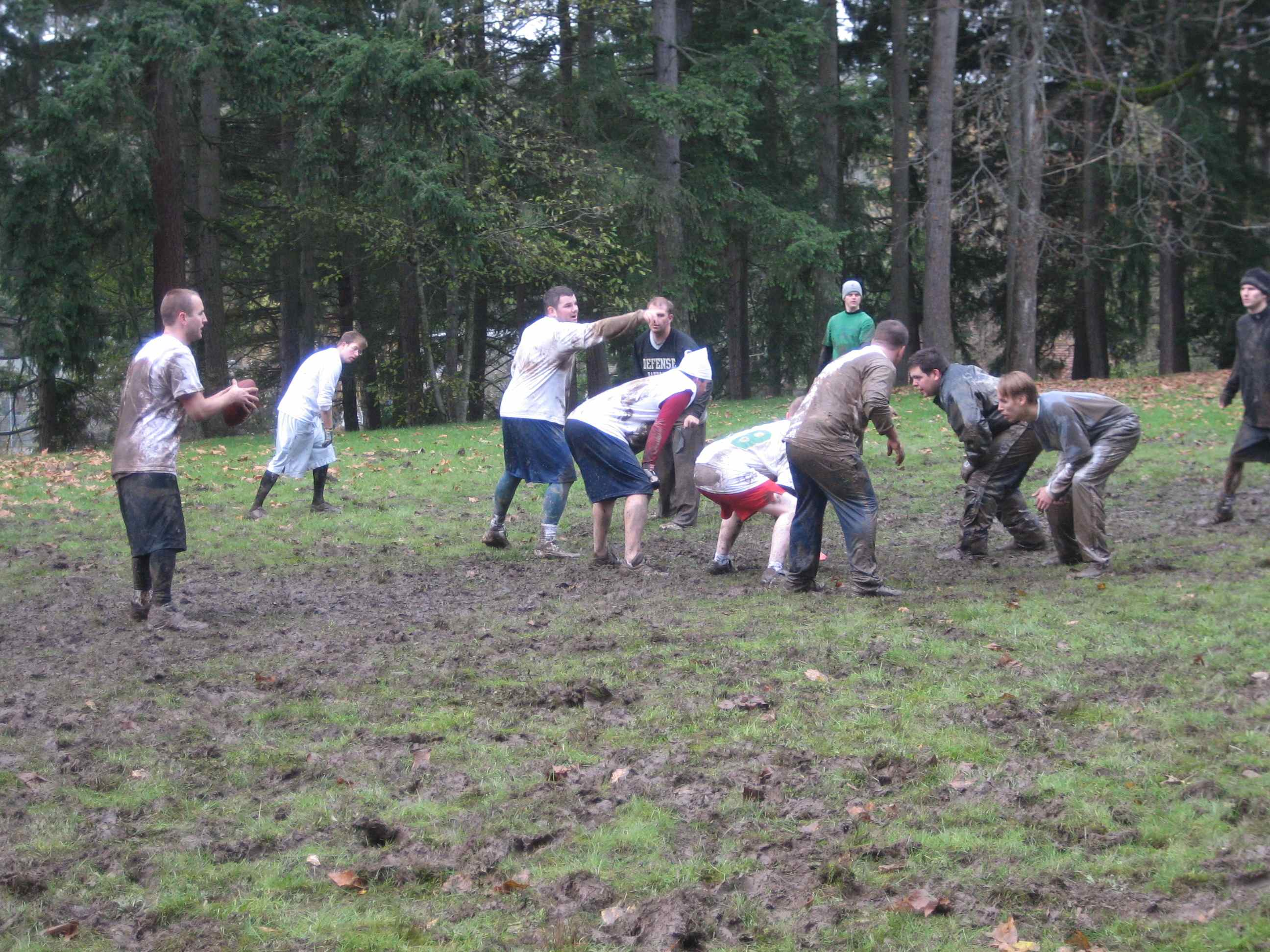
An informal "Turkey Bowl" game in Redmond, Washington

Unorganized groups have also been known to partake in American football on Thanksgiving. These informal matches are usually known as a Turkey Bowl (not to be confused with some high school football games that also use the name "Turkey Bowl", see above, and with Turkey Bowling). These games are usually unofficiated with a flag football, street football, or touch football format.

While the games themselves are not generally nationally known, select contests are known to have regional followings. Turkey Bowls hold importance for those who participate and it is not uncommon for rivalries to last for decades. Turkey Bowls are played by a variety of people including extended families, college fraternities, volunteer fire departments, and local churches across the country which use the day and the game to have fun, exercise and renew old acquaintances.
