= Turkey Bowl =

Turkey Bowl may refer to one of the following sports events:

- Turkey Bowl (high school), a common name for high school American football games held either on Thanksgiving or over Thanksgiving weekend
- Turkey Bowl (amateur), nickname for informal backyard American football games held on Thanksgiving or over Thanksgiving weekend
- Turkey bowling, a sport involving bowling with turkeys as bowling balls and soda bottles as pins
- Impact Turkey Bowl, a special tournament that was aired on the Thanksgiving night episode of Impact!
- Johns Hopkins Division of Cardiology jeopardy tournament between faculty and fellows, held the Wednesday morning before Thanksgiving since 2006
