= Bowling (disambiguation) =

Bowling is a competitive and recreational sport.

Bowling may also refer to:

== Sports ==
=== Bowling ===
- Tenpin bowling, the most popular type of bowling today
- Nine-pin bowling
- Five-pin bowling, a bowling variant which is played only in Canada
- Duckpin bowling
- Candlepin bowling
- Trick bowling
- Turkey bowling
- Feather bowling
- Irish road bowling

=== Cricket ===
- Bowling (cricket), the act of propelling the ball towards the wicket in the sport of cricket
  - Fast bowling
  - Seam bowling
  - Spin bowling
  - Underarm bowling

== Places ==
- Bowling, Tennessee
- Bowling, West Dunbartonshire, a village in Scotland
- Bowling, Yorkshire, a residential district of Bradford, West Yorkshire, England which is split into:
  - East Bowling, part of the electoral ward of Bowling and Barkerend
  - West Bowling, part of the electoral ward of Little Horton

== Arts, entertainment, and media ==
=== Television ===
- "Bowling" (Malcolm in the Middle), Emmy Award-winning 35th episode of the TV series
- "Bowling" (The Suite Life of Zack and Cody episode), a 2006 episode from the TV series

=== Other arts, entertainment, and media ===
- Bowling (solitaire)
- Bowling (1979 video game), a video game for the Atari 2600
- Bowling (1999 video game), a video game for PlayStation
- Bowling, a 1977 video game built into the RCA Studio II
- Videocart-21: Bowling, a 1978 video game for the Fairchild Channel F
- Bowling, a 1978 video game for the APF-MP1000

== Other uses ==
- Bowling (surname), a surname

== See also ==
- Bowls, a lawn sport
- Bowl (disambiguation)
- Bowler (disambiguation)
- Bowling green (disambiguation)
