= British Journal of Political Science =

- Discipline: Political science
- Language: English
- Edited by: Shaun Bowler, René Lindstädt, Petra Schleiter, Lucas Leemann, Cristina Bodea, Paul Bou-Habib, Tobias Böhmelt, Ruth Dassonneville

Publication details
- History: 1971–present
- Publisher: Cambridge University Press (United Kingdom)
- Frequency: Quarterly
- Impact factor: 4.292 (2018)

Standard abbreviations
- ISO 4: Br. J. Political Sci.

Indexing
- ISSN: 0007-1234 (print); 1469-2112 (web)
- LCCN: 70022767
- JSTOR: 00071234
- OCLC no.: 863011750

Links
- Journal homepage; Online access; Online archive

British Journal of Political Science is a quarterly peer-reviewed academic journal covering all aspects of political science.

== Abstracting and indexing ==
The journal is abstracted and indexed in EBSCOhost, International Political Science Abstracts, Current Contents/Social & Behavioral Sciences, PAIS International, Social Sciences Citation Index, CSA Worldwide Political Science Abstracts, International Bibliography of Periodical Literature and International Bibliography of Book Reviews of Scholarly Literature and Social Sciences. According to the Journal Citation Reports, the journal has a 2018 impact factor of 4.292, ranking it 4th out of 176 journals in the category "Political Science".

== Awards ==
In association with the British Academy and the Cambridge University Press, the journal awards the Brian Barry Prize in Political Science. The winning essay is then published in this journal.

== Notable staff ==
- Sarah Birch, co-editor from 2002 to 2011
- Robert E. Goodin, co-editor

== See also ==
- List of political science journals
