= John Bowler =

John Bowler may refer to:

- John Bowler (actor) (born 1952), English actor
- John Bowler (politician) (born 1949), Western Australian politician
- John Bowler (businessman) (1937–2022), English football chairman
- John Andrew Bowler (1862–1935), American educator and minister

== See also ==
- Bowler (surname)
- Bowler (disambiguation)
