= Ann Bowling =

Ann Bowling may refer to:

- Ann Patricia Bowling (born 1951), British sociologist
- Ann T. Bowling (1943–2000), American biologist

== See also ==
- Ann Dowling (born 1952), British mechanical engineer
