= Baltimore City College football =

Football team in Maryland, US

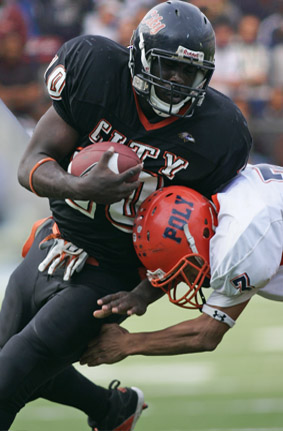
- Nickname: Knights
- Conference: MPSSAA 3A North Region
- Division: Baltimore City (Division 1)
- League: Maryland Scholastic Association (MSA) [1919-1993] Maryland Public Secondary Schools Athletic Association (MPSSAA) [1993-present]
- Stadium: George Petrides Stadium at Alumni Field
- Capacity: 2,000
- Location: Baltimore, MD, US
- Team colors: Orange and Black
- Head coach: Rodney Joyner (4th season); 22-12 (.647)
- Championships: (18) MSA Conference Championships; 1936, 1937, 1938, 1939, 1940, 1941, 1942, 1961, 1964, 1965, 1966, 1967, 1968, 1986, 1987, 1988, 1991, 1992
- Conference titles: (4) MPSSAA Regional Championships; 1996, 2001, 2005, 2023
- Division titles: (2) Baltimore City League Division Championships; 2005, 2006
- Website: bccathletics.com

The Baltimore City College football team, known as the "Black Knights", or formerly "Castlemen", and "Alamedans", has represented Baltimore City College, popularly referred to as "City", the flagship public college preparatory school in Baltimore, Maryland, United States, for nearly 150 years in the sport of gridiron football. Until 1953, the school's athletic teams were primarily referred to as the "Collegians", a moniker that is still used alternatively today. The team is the oldest high school football program in Maryland and is among the oldest high school football programs in the United States. The program was among the nation's best in the 1950s, 1960s, 1970s, 1980s, and 1990s, finishing ranked in national high school football polls on multiple occasions.

In the late-1890s, City College competed as a member of the Maryland Intercollegiate Football Association (MIFA) against colleges in Maryland and Washington, D.C. The school joined the Maryland Scholastic Association (MSA) in 1919 as a founding member and remained a member until 1992 when it withdrew to join the Maryland Public Secondary Schools Athletic Association (MPSSAA) in 1993. The school left the MSA to compete for state championships with Maryland's other public high schools.

The program has a history of producing NFL talent, with 14 alumni reaching the professional ranks of the National Football League. City College also has a legacy of successful head football coaches. This list includes George Young, former General Manager of the New York Jets and George Petrides, whose 257 career wins ranks eighth all-time among Maryland high school football coaches.

Baltimore Polytechnic Institute (Poly) has been the team's primary rival since the two schools first met in 1889. The rivalry is believed to be the second-oldest high school football rivalry in the United States between public high schools, predated only by the English High School of Boston-Boston Latin School football rivalry. The rivalry began in 1889 and the teams have met 134 times in history. City College leads the series 66–62–6.

== History ==
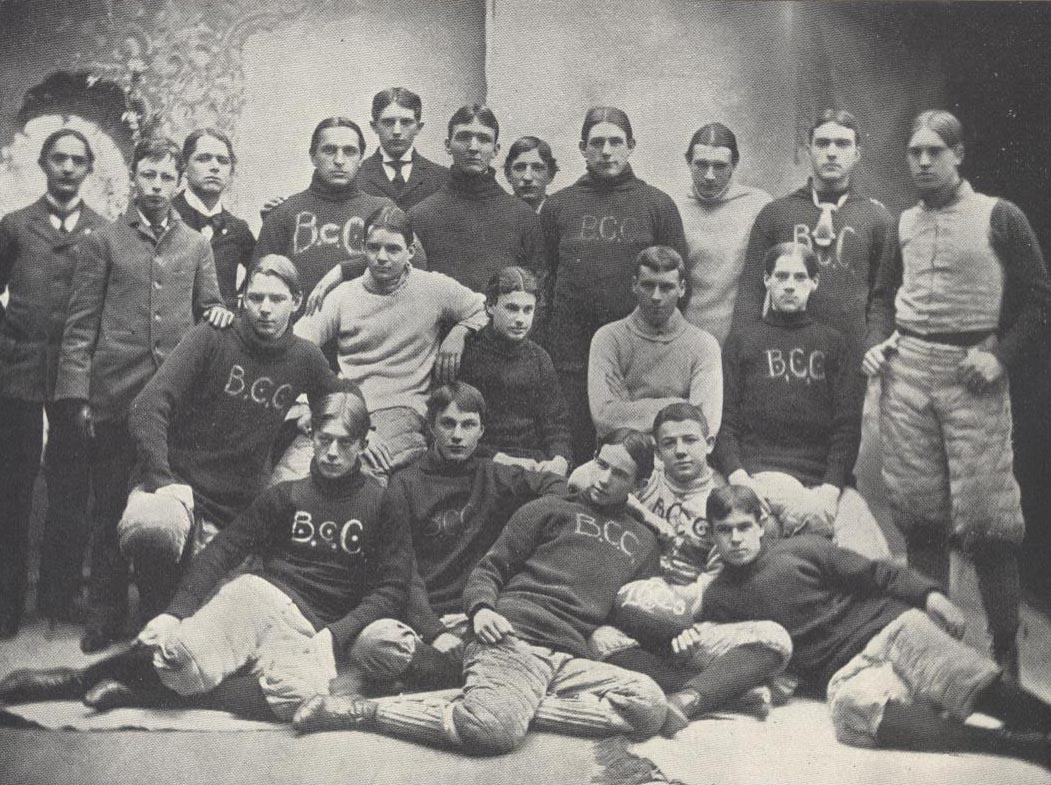
Members of the 1895 Baltimore City College football team

In the mid-1870s, the popularity of football spread to high school competition. City College became one of the first high schools in the Baltimore-area to play football, which meant that there were no organized teams at the same level. In 1895, therefore, City scheduled games against college teams such as the Maryland, the Naval Academy, Mount St. Mary's, Western Maryland and even the Fort Monroe soldiers. The record in 1895: 3 wins, 13 losses, including a 42–0 rout by Navy. In the first game of the 1896 season, Gettysburg College trounced City 50–0, but enthusiasm for the team continued to grow as evidence by the send off given them before they sailed to Hampton, Virginia to play Hampton high school. By the early 1900s, area high schools had developed football teams and City was able to compete on a more level playing field, beating, for instance, the newly formed Polytechnic team 13–0 in 1903.

Little is known about the first City–Poly game, except that it was played at northeast Baltimore's Clifton Park in 1889 between the City "reserves" team and Poly with City emerging as the victor. City won all 12 games from 1889 to 1900 when the annual clash was considered a scrub engagement. The annual meeting of the two teams has led to one of the longest continuous public high school football rivalries in the nation. By 1918, Poly and other area schools had surpassed City in their preparation for the games. According to William Tippett Jr, class of 1919, City's team did not even have a practice field because of its location in Downtown Baltimore.

=== The Harry Lawrence era ===
By 1929, the Knights had a new $3 million, 40-acre (160,000 m^{2}) home in northeast Baltimore. That same year the Knights wore new uniforms with numbers on the front and back, a historic first for high schools. The "Castle on the Hill" had spacious practice fields with a separate "game day field".

Under head coach Harry Lawrence, the Knights dominated local teams, including Poly whom they beat consecutively from 1934 to 1942; and started playing schools out of state, beating Petersburg High School in 1936. The 1936 team won all nine of its games, but was stripped of the MSA title when one of running back Arthur Deckleman was ruled ineligible. The investigating committee gave the title to the McDonough High School, which City had beaten, 12–0, during the regular season.

By 1940, Lawrence's teams were undefeated in 38 consecutive games, won three consecutive state titles and retired the trophy presented by the Evening Sun for the winner of the City-Poly game. In 1941, an undefeated City College went to Florida, to play Miami High School in the Orange Bowl stadium. The Knights, used to playing in cool autumnal or cold winter weather, lost to Miami High with the temperature exceeding 90 °F. After the season, Lawrence and his long-time assistant, Otts Helms joined the war effort; Helms was a captain in the Army and Lawrence served as a lieutenant in the Navy for the remainder of World War II. In 1947, Lawrence became the head coach at Bucknell University where future City College head football coach, George Young, played for him in the early 1950s.

Andy Defassio was hired as the head coach in 1950, his assistant coach that first year was Robert Lumsden. Lumsden soon left to take over the head coaching duties at Poly, under its legendary coach Bob Lumsden, dominated City and Maryland football during the 1950s with City unable to win any of the rivalry games during that decade.

=== The George Young era ===
The trend would reverse again as George Young took over the coaching duties in 1959. Young had actually been a history teacher at City, but an assistant coach at rival Calvert Hall College. Young brought discipline back to the practice field and an emphasis on grades. He also brought in young aggressive special teams coaches Joe Brune, Bob Patzwall, Mel Filler, and Ed Novak; all of whom would become head coaches later in their careers with Brune coaching the Loyola Dons for more than 25 years.

Young's summer camps were brutal with an emphasis on running and conditioning as opposed to tackling and kicking. Young's teams won 6 of the 8 games he coached against Poly during the 1960s and six MSA championships. One of the most memorable City–Poly games occurred on Thanksgiving Day 1965, at Baltimore's Memorial Stadium, with some 25,000 fans and alumni in attendance. City beat Poly 52–6, and completed a 10–0 season with the team being ranked eighth in the nation by a national sports poll. The 52 points scored by City are the most points scored by either team during the rivalry. Two Knights from that game, Sykes and Person went on to the National Football League; former Baltimore Mayor Kurt Schmoke was the quarterback and Maryland Delegate Curt Anderson was the captain of that team the next year.

External videos
- 1965 City-Poly game (1st quarter) Head Coach: George Young, Quarterback: Kurt Schmoke Baltimore City College video

The tradition of the game being played on Thanksgiving ended in 1992 when Baltimore City public schools sports programs moved to the Maryland Public Secondary Schools Athletic Association (MPSSAA). Football playoffs for the MPSSAA generally start in the second week of November. The City-Poly game is now played the first week of November at the home of the Baltimore Ravens, M&T Bank Stadium, in downtown Baltimore.

=== The George Petrides era ===
The Knights on defense vs. Poly, 1994

George Petrides, a 1967 City College graduate, served as head football coach from 1975 until he retired in 2015. His 40-year tenure was longer than the previous 10 coaches combined. During the 1960s, Petrides played on City College teams that never lost a game, but at the beginning of his coaching career, he was faced with almost impossible circumstances. The City College main academic building was being renovated forcing enrollment to plummet and the student body to take courses at the old Poly building on North Avenue in midtown Baltimore. The athletic practice field was two miles (3 km) away, and in 1979 Petrides was forced to use his junior varsity team to play Poly's varsity because of the dwindling enrollment. The Castle on the Hill reopened in 1978 but the Knights did not manage a win against Poly again until 1987.

During the 1990s, a rebirth of City College football dominance occurred. During that time, Petrides and his top assistant coach Angelo Geppi led the team through a 29-game winning streak, the longest consecutive winning streak in the history of Maryland high school football. Petrides and Geppi also led the team to two consecutive MSA-A Conference championships in 1991 and 1992.

In 1993, Baltimore City Schools withdrew from the MSA to join the other public schools in the state in the Maryland Public Secondary Schools Athletic Association (MPSSAA). The move meant that City College could compete in a statewide play-off system and perhaps earn a state championship, but because of scheduling conflicts with the state playoffs, City would have to hold its traditional game against Poly three weeks before Thanksgiving.

On September 11, 2006, Petrides was honored as the Baltimore Ravens High School Coach of the Week for the third time. Less than a month later, City and Poly clashed in the 118th City–Poly football game. Petrides' Black Knights beat Poly 44–8, won the Baltimore City championship, and finished the 2006 season 11–1, but lost the Maryland state class 3A North championship game, 7–6.

On August 5, 2015, Petrides announced that he was retiring as the head football coach. During his 40 years at the helm of the football program, Petrides' teams racked up 257 wins, 141 losses, and one tie. Petrides' teams won five Maryland Scholastic Association championships and two Baltimore City Division I titles. He led the Knights to perfect seasons in 1987, 1991 and 1992.

=== Maryland Public Secondary School Athletic Association (MPSSAA) era (1993-present) ===
City College joined the Maryland Public Secondary School Athletic Association (MPSSAA) in 1993 and was expected to compete for football championships immediately after having won a MSA football championship in 1992. City College football has won four MPSSAA regional championships in 1996, 2001, 2005, and 2023 and two MPSSAA district championships in 2005 and 2006. George Petrides, the longest-serving head football coach in school history, announced his retirement in 2015. His 275 career wins ranks eight all-time among Maryland high school football coaches. His contributions to the program is commemorated by the naming of the team's stadium George Petrides Stadium at Alumni Field. The current head coach is Rodney Joyner, who led the program to an appearance in the 2023 MPSSAA Class 3A state semifinals, the program's first state semifinals appearance since 2005.

== City-Poly rivalry ==
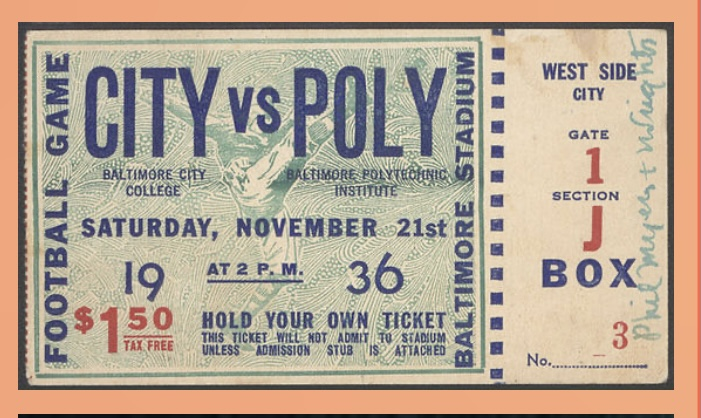
An admission ticket to the 1936 City-Poly game.

The City–Poly football rivalry, also referred to as the "City-Poly game" is an American football rivalry between the Baltimore City College Black Knights (City) and the Baltimore Polytechnic Institute Engineers (Poly). This matchup is the oldest football rivalry in Maryland. The rivalry is believed to be the second-oldest high school football rivalry in the United States between public high schools, predated only by the English High School of Boston-Boston Latin School football rivalry, which started two years earlier in 1887. The rivalry began in 1889 and the teams have met 134 times in history. In 2023, City won its 12th consecutive game in the rivalry, and now leads the series 68–63–6.

"The Game", as this rivalry is commonly referred to, has featured legendary high school football coaches like Harry Lawrence, Bob Lumsden, George Petrides, and George Young. In all, 25 former players in the City-Poly game ultimately played in the National Football League (NFL), which includes the 14 NFL players City has produced.

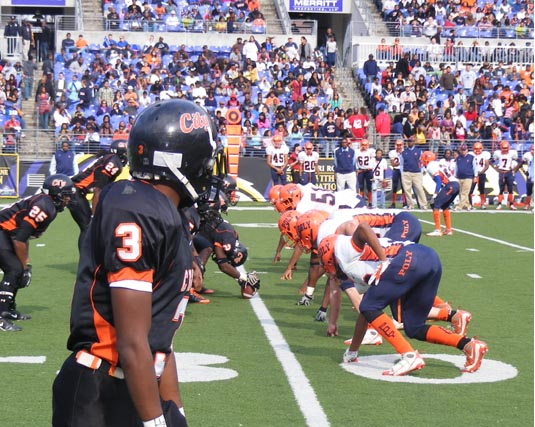
City v Poly 2008

The first game in the rivalry was played on a field in northeast Baltimore's Clifton Park without spectators. Beginning in 1922, the game has been played at in large stadiums with seating capacities of 65,000 or more. From 1922 to 1996, the game was played at Baltimore Memorial Stadium, a multi-purpose stadium that was home to the Baltimore Colts and the Baltimore Ravens of the NFL and Major League Baseball's Baltimore Orioles. When the Ravens moved to M&T Bank Stadium in downtown Baltimore, the game moved to that location. The last City-Poly game at M&T Bank was played in 2017. The game is now played at Hughes Stadium on the campus of Morgan State University. In October, 2024, City beat Poly 40-0 running their winning streak over their cross-town rival to 12 games.

== Head coaching history ==
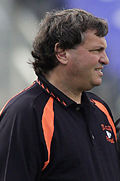
George Petrides, City College Black Knights head football coach, 1975-2015

Baltimore City College has had 28 head coaches since organized football began in the early-1900s. The program has been led by several successful head coaches over the years. This list of notable head football coaches includes:

- Harry Lawrence, who was head football coach from 1934 to 1941 and again in 1946, leading the team to a win-loss-tie record of 69–10–6 (.870). Lawrence left City College following the 1946 season to become head football coach at Bucknell University.
- George Young was head football coach from 1959 to 1967. In his nine seasons as head coach, Young led the program to a win-loss-tie record of 60-11-2 (.927) and six MSA conference championships. After a coaching stint with the Baltimore Colts, Young became the General Manager of the New York Giants. Under Young's leadership, the Giants won fifty-three percent of their games, four NFC titles and two Super Bowls and the senior vice president of football operations for the National Football League.
- George Petrides served as head football coach from 1975 until his retirement in 2015. In his 40 years at the helm, Petrides led the program to a win-loss-tie record of 257–144–1 (.670) and retired as the second-winningest high school football coach (by career wins) in Maryland behind only Good Counsel High School's Bob Malloy. Petrides won five MSA conference championships in 1986, 1987, 1988, 1991, 1992, two MPSSAA division championships in 2005 and 2006, and three MPSSAA regional championships in 1996, 2001, 2005.

The 28 individuals who have served as Baltimore City College head football coach during the years are listed below.

No.	Name	Seasons
1	Hay Eichelberger	1904–1907
2	Captain Steinbacker	1908–1909
3	D. Claude Stonecipher	1910–1911
4	Harry (Dutch) Ruhle	1912–1914
5	Michael J. Thompson	1915–1916
6	Ferdinand Bonnette	1917
7	Herb Armstrong	1918
8	John Coulbourn	1919–1921
9	Chester H. Katenkamp	1922
10	Henry "Pop" Goodard	1923–1928
11	Vic Schmid	1929–1930
12	David Kaufman	1931–1933
13	Harry Lawrence	1934–1941
14	Charles Hirschauer	1942–1944
15	Charley Rudo	1945
16	Harry Lawrence	1946
17	Otts Helms	1947–1949
18	Andy Defassio	1950–1951
19	Otts Helm	1952–1953
20	Frank Lee	1954–1958
21	George Young	1959–1967
22	Robert Patzwall	1968
23	Robert Terpening	1969–1970
24	Ron Chartrand	1971–1974
25	George Petrides	1975–2015
26	Daryl Wade	2015–2017
27	Mike Hamilton	2017–2019
28	Rodney Joyner	2020–present

== City College players in the National Football League ==
The program has a history of producing talented players who ultimately play professional football at the highest level. 14 City College football alumni have played in the National Football League (NFL). This list includes current NFL player Malik Hamm (Baltimore Ravens), as well as former NFL players like Charles Tapper, Bryant Johnson, and others, showcasing the program's ability to develop athletes capable of competing at the highest levels of the football.

Player	Pos	Teams	From	To
Malik Hamm	LB	BAL	2023	present
Charles Tapper	DE	DAL	2017	2017
Bryant Johnson	WR	ARI, SFO, DET, HOU	2003	2011
George Ragsdale	RB-WR	TAM	1977	1979
Tom Gatewood	TE-WR	NYG	1972	1973
Ara Person	TE	STL	1972	1972
John Sykes	WR	SDG	1972	1972
Bob Baldwin	FB	BAL	1966	1966
Reid Lennon	G-C-T	WAS, LAD	1945	1947
Gil Meyer	E-DE	BCL	1947	1947
John Wright	B	BCL	1947	1947
Art Brandau	C-G	PIT	1945	1946
Nick Campofreda	C-T	WAS	1944	1944

== Past seasons results, standings ==
Results and standings 1895–1934
Year	W	L	T	PF	PA	Comments
1895	3	12	0	50	260	losses included 42–0 (Naval Academy), & 6–0 (University of Maryland)
1896	2	5	0	24	116	opponents included a mix of high school and college teams
1897	1	3	1	8	62	uniform colors were gold, black and white
1898	1	2	1	8	62	
1899						
1900						
1901						beat Poly 5–0
1902						
1903	4	1	2	54	11	beat Poly 10–0
1904	2	1	0	35	6	won championship
1905	7	1	0	94	33	only loss: 18–0 to Central High of Philadelphia
1906						only highschool football team to be pictured in the Spalding Official Football Guide
1907	2	2	3	87	51	beat Loyola College, 53–0
1908	2	2	3			identical record to 1907 but first loss to Poly, 11–0
1909	2	4	1	42	61	loss to Poly, 11–0
1910	4	3	0	38	52	
1911	3	3	1	28	36	
1912	5	3	0	191	101	
1913	1	4	0			
1914	2	2	2	46	46	
1915	2	4	0	96	102	
1916	5	1	1	133	18	only loss was to Poly
1917						
1918	0	6	0	15	128	
1919						
1920						
1921	3	3	0	34	103	
1922	6	1	0	195	41	beat Poly, 27–0, after 8-year drought
1923	5	2	1	118	42	all 5 wins were by shut out, including 14–0 over Poly
1924						beat Poly
1925	5	5	0	71	209	all 5 losses were by shut out, including a 94-0 thumping by Lindbloom
1926						Harry Lawrence kicked winning field goal for Poly
1927	2	5	1	35	70	
1928	3	6	1	70	144	
1929	4	3	0	30	33	
1930	2	4	1	30	71	
1931	1	8	1	52	128	played Poly twice, 7–7 tie and 0–2 loss in charity game
1932	4	4	3	111	63	played Poly twice, 2 ties, 2nd tie counted as a loss
1933	0	8	0	12	129	no returning seniors
1934	5	2	1	103	37	Public School champions

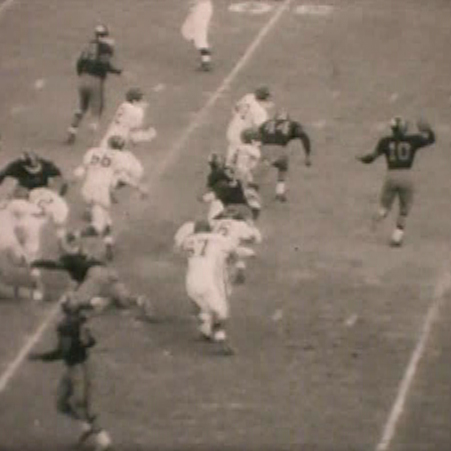
City quarterback Kurt Schmoke completes pass in the 1965 game

Results and standings 1935–1974
Year	W	L	T	PF	PA	Comments
1935	4	1	1	109	18	only loss was to Mt. St. Joe who won MSA championship
1936	9	0	0	221	6	MSA champions, 8 wins by shut-out (title later forfeited, ineligible player)
1937	7	0	1	155	24	MSA champions
1938	9	0	1	271	12	MSA champions, largest margin of victory to that point over Poly (33–0)
1939	10	0	0	198	30	MSA champions
1940	8	0	1	206	6	MSA champions, all wins by shut-out
1941	8	2	0	230	40	MSA champions, lost last game to Miami Sr. High in Miami, Fl.
1942	6	1	1	139	28	MSA champions
1943	3	3	2	77	98	lost to Navy plebes, 46–0
1944	4	2	1	61	39	
1945	1	5	1	58	108	only win was over an undefeated Forest Park team
1946	3	5	1	104	149	
1947	6	3	0	161	75	23,000 in attendance at the City-Poly game
1948						
1949	5	4	0	125	96	
1950	2	4	1	84	128	
1951	2	7	1	69	193	Al Kaline was team captain
1952	3	4	1	110	126	shut-out by Poly
1953	2	4	1	26	64	20,000 in attendance at City-Poly game
1954	2	5	0	71	122	
1955	3	4	1	94	92	17,242 at City-poly game
1956	6	2	0	126	53	beat a George Young coached Calvert Hall team
1957						
1958	4	3	1	113	65	
1959	8	1	0			Lost to Poly
1960	3	3	2	70	98	beat Poly after 11-year drought
1961	8	0	0	258	38	MSA-A conference champions
1962	3	3	2	141	99	4th, MSA-A conference, Tom Duley at QB
1963	6	1	0	166	60	2nd, MSA-A conf., ended Bates of Annapolis 27 game win streak
1964						MSA-A conference champions
1965	9	0	0	331	49	MSA-A conference champions, ranked 7th in U.S., Kurt Schmoke at QB
1966	7	0	2	239	45	MSA-A conference co-champions, Schmoke at QB
1967	7	2	0	266	105	MSA-A conference co-champions
1968	7	2	0	162	82	MSA-A conference champions
1969	5	3	1	162	134	
1970						
1971						
1972						
1973	2	7	0			
1974	2	6	1			

Results and standings 1975–2014
Year	W	L	T	PF	PA	Comments
1975	3	7	0	110	226	
1976						
1977	4	6	0	n/a	n/a	
1978	1	8	0	na	na	5,000 attendance at Poly game
1979	na	na				(no varsity teams at City in 1979)
1980	na	na				(no varsity teams at City in 1980)
1981	5	5	0	183	138	
1982						
1983	7	2	1	172	92	
1984	4	6	0	100	171	lost 48–0 to Poly, largest deficit in series
1985	3	6	0	80	175	
1986	8	3	0	263	121	MSA B-conference champions
1987	11	0	0			MSA B-conference champions, ended 17 game losing streak to Poly
1988	8	2	0	252	72	MSA-B conference champions
1989	6	2	0	159	88	
1990	6	4	0	171	101	
1991	10	0	0	282	57	MSA-A conference champions
1992	10	0	0	268	52	MSA-A conference champions
1993	9	1	0	340	97	made state quarterfinals
1994	8	2				
1995	4	6				
1996	9	3				made state semifinals
1997	7	3	0	224	111	
1998	7	3	0	159	138	
1999	1	8	0	72	244	
2000	6	4	0	217	132	
2001	11	1	0	298*	114	made state semifinals but lost to Hereford 9–0
						*point totals include a 2–0 win over Poly caused by Poly forfeit
2002	7	4	0	238	95	made state quarterfinals
2003	7	3	0	n/a	n/a	
2004	6	4	0	216	186	finished 5th, Baltimore City, did not make state playoffs
2005	11	2	0	212	136	Baltimore City Champions, lost in state semifinals (class 2-A north)
2006	11	1	0	356	33	Baltimore City Champions, lost 7–6, in 2nd round of state playoffs (3-A)
2007	8	3	0	315	217	moved back to class 2-A lost, first round, state playoffs
2008	6	4	0	249	133	
2009	7	3	0			
2010	8	4	0			lost 7–6 in 2nd round of state playoffs
2011	5	4	0			lost to Poly
2012	6	4	0			beat Poly
2013	8	3	0			lost to River Hill, 1st round of playoffs
2014	5	6	0			lost to Glenelg, 1st round of playoffs
2015	5	5	0	239	143	beat Poly 42–6
2016	6	4	0			beat Poly in 2OT
2017						beat Poly
2018						beat Poly
2019	5	5	0	171	150	beat Poly
2020	0	0	0	0	0	No games due to the COVID-19 pandemic.
2021	8	4	0	290	155	beat Poly twice, lost to Linganore High School in 1st round of playoffs
2022	6	3	0	182	171	beat Poly (disqualified from state playoffs)
