= Bowl (disambiguation) =

A bowl is a common vessel used to serve food.

Bowl(s) or The Bowl may also refer to:

- Bowl (smoking), in cannabis culture
- a dish served in a bowl, such as a Buddha bowl
- Bowl, part of a letter in typeface anatomy
- Bowl game, in American football
- Bowls, an outdoor bowling sport in the UK
- Bowls (photograph), a 1916 photograph by Paul Strand
- The Bowl (Cherokee chief) (died 1839), a leader of the Chickamauga Cherokee
- The Bowl (Douglas), a stadium in Douglas, Isle of Man, UK
- "The Bowl", a short story by F. Scott Fitzgerald, included in The Short Stories of F. Scott Fitzgerald
- Beatrice Wind Farm, or Beatrice Offshore Windfarm Ltd., on the northeast coast of Scotland
- Prominent water (H_{2}O/"bowl" type), a type of trans-Neptunian object based on their spectra

== See also ==
- List of college bowl games
- Bol (disambiguation)
- Bole (disambiguation)
- Boule (disambiguation)
- Bowler (disambiguation)
- Bowles (disambiguation)
- Bowling (disambiguation)
