= Bowling (surname) =

Bowling is a surname. Notable people with the surname include:

- Ann Patricia Bowling (born 1951), British sociologist
- Ann T. Bowling (1943–2000), American geneticist
- Bo Bowling (born 1987), American football player
- Dan Bowling (1946–2023), Virginia state delegate
- Nicholas Bowling, British speculative fiction author
- Francis S. Bowling (1916–1997), justice of the Supreme Court of Mississippi
- Frank Bowling (born 1936), British artist
- John C. Bowling (fl. 1990s–2020s), president of Olivet Nazarene University in Bourbonnais, Illinois
- Kansas Bowling (born 1996), American film director, screenwriter, cinematographer, and actress
- Victor Ray Bowling, American drag queen also known as Victoria "Porkchop" Parker
