= High School Showcase =

- Country of origin: United States

Production
- Running time: 3 hours

Original release
- Network: ESPN, ESPN2 and ESPNU
- Release: August 27, 2005 – present

High School Showcase, known under its corporate sponsored name as the GEICO High School Showcase, is a presentation of high school football and high school basketball on ESPN, ESPN2 and ESPNU. Since debuting in 2005, it primarily airs on Friday at 8pm ET on ESPNU, following ESPNU Recruiting Insider, but will occasionally air at various times and days on ESPN and ESPN2. The Friday Night Showcase game is called by Jason Benetti and ESPN Recruiting Coordinator Craig Haubert. Various commentators call other games throughout the week, although Mike Hall and Tom Luginbill anchor the halftime report and in-game updates. The series was previously Old Spice Red Zone High School Showcase; the series also has previously had Honda as a presenting sponsor. What games can be broadcast are limited by state high school sports sanctioning bodies; some states restrict or block game broadcasts entirely to encourage in-person game attendance.

Old Spice High School Showcase debuted in 2005 as a way to fill programming on the then-nascent ESPNU channel, which had debuted in March 2005. The series aired only four games in 2005, but after much success ESPN expanded its schedule to a full thirteen game season. Part of what lead ESPN to expanding its schedule is, in 2005, ESPN aired the highest rated high school football game in television history. Nease High School (Florida) vs. Hoover High School (Alabama) garnered a 1.0 rating and attracted nearly one million households.

Most High School Showcase games span from late August through the end of October. Only once has the showcase aired a Thanksgiving game, the 2006 matchup between Lehigh Valley rivals Easton, PA and Phillipsburg, NJ; ESPNU has switched to coverage of college basketball in November, limiting the channel's opportunities to cover high school contests.

Old Spice High School Showcase started to air high school basketball games in 2006, as well.

Games in the High School Showcase are also broadcast on ESPN3.

ESPN also airs post season programming of the Geico State Champions Bowl Series, featuring a current season's high school football state champion playing against another state's champion.

== Bishop Sycamore controversy ==
In the summer of 2021, ESPN drew controversy for featuring a game between IMG Academy, a prominent preparatory school for prospective college football players, and the Bishop Sycamore Centurions. Shortly after IMG roundly defeated Bishop Sycamore 58–0 on August 29, questions about the Centurions, their school, players and administrators began to emerge. The school's address was traced to an athletic complex in Columbus, Ohio, but no evidence of any educational operations has ever been found. ESPN stated that the game, as with all of its High School Showcase matchups, was scheduled by Paragon Marketing Group, who admitted failing to do due diligence on the school. IMG had agreed to the matchup despite soundly defeating the team the previous season as well, 56–6, part of a campaign in which the Centurions went 0–6; no evidence of the team or school exists before 2019. Bishop Sycamore had also, without the knowledge of Paragon and against all high school sanctioning bodies' rules regarding time requirements between games, played a game in Pennsylvania less than 48 hours prior to their appearance on High School Showcase, and the team's claims of having a roster stacked with Division I prospects was proven false, with most of the roster consisting of recent high school graduates who had gone unrecruited by colleges and some of whom had also lied about their age. It was initially reported as an online charter school, but the Ohio Department of Education stated that it was a religious academy that did not file for a charter; there is no bishop named Sycamore in the Roman Catholic Diocese of Columbus for whom the school would be named.

== See also ==
- ESPNU Recruiting Insider
