= TCU–Texas Tech football rivalry =

American college football rivalry

West Texas Championship
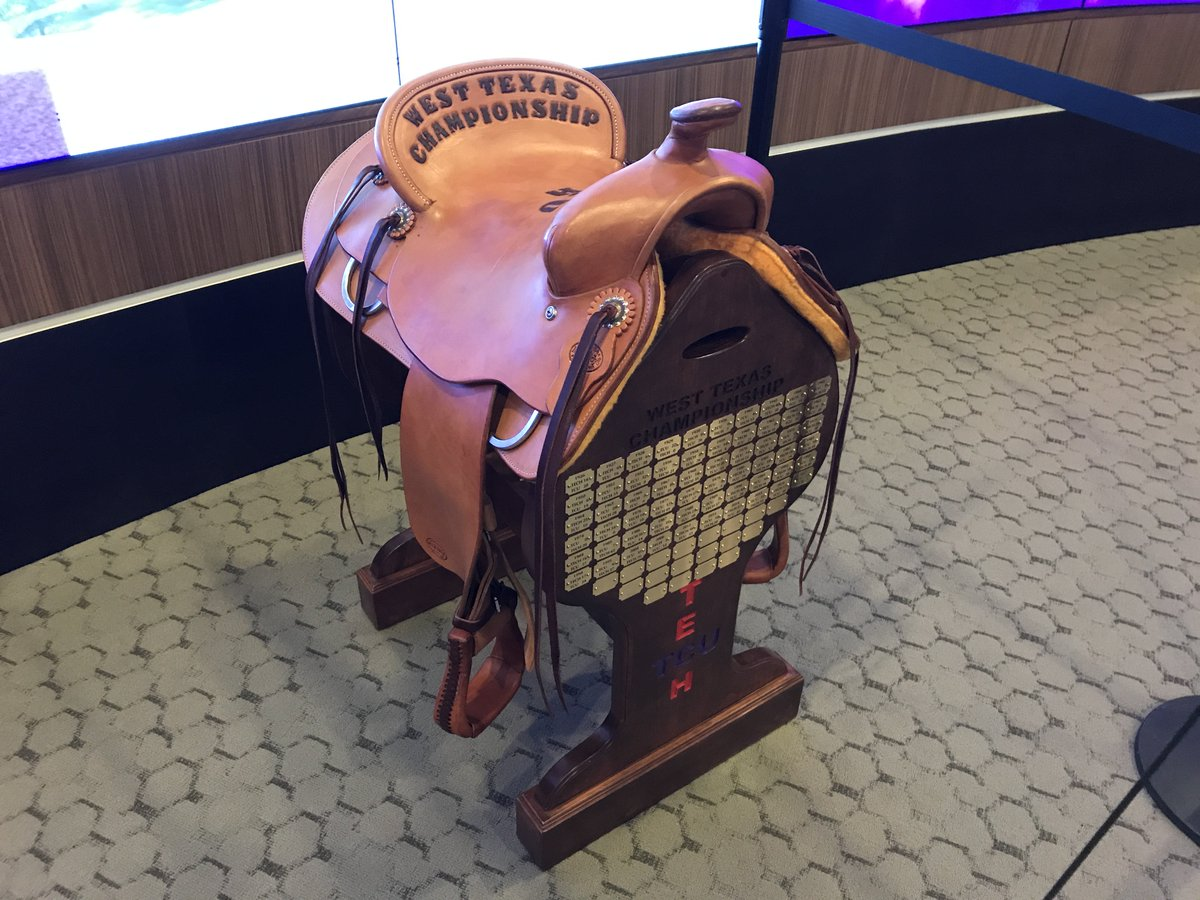
- The West Texas Championship Saddle is the traveling trophy between the Red Raiders and Horned Frogs

- TCU Horned Frogs Texas Tech Red Raiders
- First meeting: October 30, 1926; TCU 28, Texas Tech 16
- Latest meeting: October 26, 2024; TCU 35, Texas Tech 34
- Next meeting: November 26, 2026
- Trophy: "West Texas Championship" Saddle Trophy (1961–c. 1970; 2017–present)

Statistics
- Total meetings: 67
- All-time series: Texas Tech leads, 33–31–3
- Largest victory: Texas Tech, 63–7 (1985)
- Largest goal scoring: October 25, 2014; TCU 82, Texas Tech 27
- Longest win streak: Texas Tech, 6 (1973–1978, 1985–1990)
- Current win streak: TCU, 1 (2024–present)

Locations of TCU and Texas Tech

The TCU–Texas Tech football rivalry is an American college football rivalry between the TCU Horned Frogs football team of Texas Christian University (TCU), and the Texas Tech Red Raiders football team of Texas Tech University. The winner of the annual game is presented with the Saddle Trophy, a traveling icon which bears plaques marking the score of each meeting between the rival schools. The teams have met on the gridiron in 67 games since 1926. The "West Texas Championship – Saddle Trophy" was first awarded, from 1961 through 1970. During this ten-year stretch, the schools split the series 5–5. The trophy was lost and the rivalry name disappeared for decades until the moniker and trophy were reintroduced in 2017. This football game is known as the West Texas Championship – Battle for the Saddle Trophy.

== History ==
From 1926 through 1955, TCU and Texas Tech frequently played as non-conference opponents.

In 1956, Texas Tech joined the Southwest Conference (SWC), and the teams played annually as conference opponents, except in 1957 (as Texas Tech was not a full member of the SWC until 1960), until the conference's dissolution in 1995.

After the dissolution of the SWC, the teams played a home-and-home series in 2004 and 2006 with the home team winning each time (Texas Tech in 2004, TCU in 2006).

In 2012, TCU joined the Big 12 Conference and the teams renewed their annual rivalry.

Texas Tech leads the overall series 33–30–3. TCU led the series 10–6 in the early years, 1926–1959. During Southwest Conference play in 1960–1995, Texas Tech led the series 21–12–3 (the series' 3 ties came in 3 straight games in Lubbock in 1979, 1981 and 1983). As members of different conferences during 1996–2011, the two teams met twice and split, 1–1. In Big 12 competition 2012–2023, TCU holds a 7–5 lead.

The series has featured many close games and some games with large margins of victory. Texas Tech holds the overall largest victory margin in the series with 56 points in a 63–7 win on November 9, 1985, in Lubbock. Tech's next largest victory margin was a 35-point margin in a 70–35 victory on September 18, 2004, also in Lubbock. TCU's largest victory margin was by 55 points in an 82–27 victory in Fort Worth on October 25, 2014. The 82 points scored was the most points ever scored against Texas Tech and the most points ever scored against any team in Big 12 history. The Frogs and Raiders have only met twice with both teams ranked in the top 25, in 2006 and 2012. Both games were played in Fort Worth and won by the higher-ranked team (TCU 12–3 in 2006 and Texas Tech in 3OT 56–53 in 2012).

For 2026, the game was scheduled for Thanksgiving Day.

== Game results ==
Rankings based on the Associated Press Poll released prior to the game.

TCU victories	Texas Tech victories	Tie games

No.	Date	Location	Winner	Score
1	October 30, 1926	Fort Worth	TCU	28–16
2	October 8, 1927	Fort Worth	TCU	16–6
3	October 27, 1928	Fort Worth	TCU	28–6
4	October 26, 1929	Lubbock	TCU	22–0
5	October 25, 1930	Fort Worth	TCU	26–0
6	September 26, 1936	Lubbock	Texas Tech	7–0
7	November 7, 1942	Lubbock	Texas Tech	13–6
8	November 6, 1943	Fort Worth	Texas Tech	40–20
9	November 11, 1944	Fort Worth	TCU	14–0
10	November 10, 1945	Lubbock	Texas Tech	12–0
11	October 14, 1950	Fort Worth	TCU	19–6
12	October 13, 1951	Lubbock	Texas Tech	33–19
13	September 24, 1955	Lubbock	TCU	32–0
14	November 10, 1956	Lubbock	Texas Tech	21–7
15	October 11, 1958	Fort Worth	TCU	26–0
16	October 10, 1959	Lubbock	TCU	14–8
17	October 8, 1960	Fort Worth	TCU	21–7
18	October 14, 1961	Lubbock	Texas Tech	10–0
19	October 13, 1962	Fort Worth	TCU	35–13
20	October 12, 1963	Lubbock	TCU	35–3
21	October 10, 1964	Fort Worth	Texas Tech	25–10
22	October 9, 1965	Lubbock	Texas Tech	28–24
23	October 8, 1966	Fort Worth	TCU	6–3
24	November 11, 1967	Fort Worth	TCU	16–0
25	November 9, 1968	Lubbock	Texas Tech	31–14
26	November 8, 1969	Fort Worth	TCU	35–26
27	November 7, 1970	Lubbock	Texas Tech	22–14
28	November 6, 1971	Fort Worth	TCU	17–6
29	November 11, 1972	Lubbock	TCU	31–7
30	November 10, 1973	Fort Worth	#12 Texas Tech	24–10
31	November 9, 1974	Lubbock	#19 Texas Tech	28–0
32	November 8, 1975	Fort Worth	Texas Tech	34–0
33	November 6, 1976	Fort Worth	#5 Texas Tech	14–10
34	November 6, 1977	Lubbock	Texas Tech	49–17

No.	Date	Location	Winner	Score
35	November 11, 1978	Fort Worth	Texas Tech	21–17
36	November 10, 1979	Lubbock	Tie	3–3
37	November 8, 1980	Fort Worth	TCU	24–17
38	November 7, 1981	Lubbock	Tie	39–39
39	November 6, 1982	Fort Worth	Texas Tech	16–14
40	November 5, 1983	Lubbock	Tie	10–10
41	November 10, 1984	Fort Worth	#15 TCU	27–16
42	November 9, 1985	Lubbock	Texas Tech	63–7
43	November 8, 1986	Fort Worth	#23 Texas Tech	36–14
44	November 7, 1987	Lubbock	Texas Tech	36–35
45	November 5, 1988	Fort Worth	Texas Tech	23–10
46	November 11, 1989	Lubbock	#23 Texas Tech	37–7
47	November 10, 1990	Fort Worth	Texas Tech	40–28
48	September 28, 1991	Lubbock	TCU	30–16
49	November 14, 1992	Fort Worth	Texas Tech	31–28
50	November 6, 1993	Lubbock	Texas Tech	49–21
51	November 24, 1994	Fort Worth	TCU	24–17
52	November 11, 1995	Lubbock	Texas Tech	27–6
53	September 18, 2004	Lubbock	Texas Tech	70–35
54	September 16, 2006	Fort Worth	#20 TCU	12–3
55	October 20, 2012	Fort Worth	#17 Texas Tech	56–53^{3OT}
56	September 12, 2013	Lubbock	Texas Tech	20–10
57	October 25, 2014	Fort Worth	#10 TCU	82–27
58	September 26, 2015	Lubbock	#3 TCU	55–52
59	October 29, 2016	Fort Worth	Texas Tech	27–24^{2OT}
60	November 18, 2017	Lubbock	#12 TCU	27–3
61	October 11, 2018	Fort Worth	Texas Tech	17–14
62	November 16, 2019	Lubbock	TCU	33–31
63	November 7, 2020	Fort Worth	TCU	34–18
64	October 9, 2021	Lubbock	TCU	52–31
65	November 5, 2022	Fort Worth	#7 TCU	34–24
66	November 2, 2023	Lubbock	Texas Tech	35–28
67	October 26, 2024	Fort Worth	TCU	35–34
Series: Texas Tech leads 33–31–3

== See also ==
- List of NCAA college football rivalry games
