= Peter Bowler =

Peter Bowler may refer to:

- Peter Bowler (lexicographer) (1934–2020), Australian lexicographer
- Peter J. Bowler (born 1944), historian of science
- Peter Bowler (cricketer) (born 1963), Australian cricketer who played for Derbyshire, Somerset and Leicestershire

== See also ==
- Bowler (disambiguation)
