= Art Brandau =

American football player (1922–2001)

No. 79, 45
- Positions: Center, guard

Personal information
- Born: June 23, 1922; Baltimore, Maryland, U.S.
- Died: January 8, 2001 (aged 78); Lewes, Delaware, U.S.
- Listed height: 6 ft 2 in (1.88 m)
- Listed weight: 210 lb (95 kg)

Career information
- High school: Baltimore City College
- College: Tennessee
- NFL draft: 1945: 10th round, 89th overall pick

Career history
- Pittsburgh Steelers (1945–1946); Brooklyn Dodgers (1948)*
- * Offseason or practice squad member only

Career NFL statistics
- Games played: 6
- Stats at Pro Football Reference

Arthur Albert Brandau (June 23, 1922 – January 8, 2001) was an American professional football lineman who played two seasons with the Pittsburgh Steelers of the National Football League (NFL). He was selected by the Steelers in the tenth round of the 1945 NFL draft. He played college football at the University of Tennessee.

== Early life and college ==
Arthur Albert Brandau was born on June 23, 1922, in Baltimore, Maryland. He attended Baltimore City College for high school.

He played college football for the Tennessee Volunteers of the University of Tennessee and was a letter-winner in 1942. His football career was interrupted by a stint in the United States Army Air Forces during World War II. He played for the Third Air Force Gremlins during the war.

== Professional career ==
Brandau was selected by the Pittsburgh Steelers in the tenth round, with the 89th overall pick, of the 1945 NFL draft. He signed with the Steelers in 1945 and played in one game for the team during the 1945 season. He played in five games for the Steelers in 1946. He became a free agent after the 1946 season.

Brandau signed with the Brooklyn Dodgers of the All-America Football Conference in 1948 but was later released.

== Death ==
Brandau died on January 8, 2001, in Lewes, Delaware.
