= Thomas Bowler =

Thomas Bowler may refer to:

- Thomas William Bowler (1812–1869), British landscape painter
- Thomas Bowler (RAF officer) (1895–1974), Royal Air Force officer

== See also ==
- Thomas Bowdler (1754 – 1825) was an English physician known for publishing The Family Shakespeare
- Thomas Bowdler the Younger (1782–1856), nephew of Thomas Bowdler and engaged in his works
