= The International Journal of Aging and Human Development =

- Discipline: Gerontology
- Language: English
- Edited by: Julie Hicks Patrick

Publication details
- Former names: Aging and Human Development
- History: 1970–present
- Publisher: SAGE Publications
- Frequency: 8/year
- Impact factor: 2.0 (2022)

Standard abbreviations
- ISO 4: Int. J. Aging Hum. Dev.

Indexing
- CODEN: AGHDAT
- ISSN: 0091-4150 (print); 1541-3535 (web)
- LCCN: 73645523
- OCLC no.: 615522364

Links
- Journal homepage; Online access; Online archive

The International Journal of Aging and Human Development is a peer-reviewed medical journal covering gerontology from multiple disciplinary perspectives. It was established in 1970 as Aging and Human Development, obtaining its current name in 1973. It is published eight times per year by SAGE Publications and the editor-in-chief is Julie Hicks Patrick (West Virginia University). According to the Journal Citation Reports, the journal has a 2022 impact factor of 2.0.
