= Bowler Communications System =

The Bowler Communications System is an open protocol developed by Neuron Robotics for simplified communications between components in cyber-physical systems.
