= Holden Bowler =

American singer

Holden Bowler (September 23, 1912 - October 31, 2001) was an American athlete, singer and businessman who served as the namesake for Holden Caulfield in J.D. Salinger's novel The Catcher in the Rye and was the godfather of Judy Collins.

== Early life ==
Bowler was born in Shoshone, Idaho on September 23, 1912, but his family moved to Gooding, Idaho in 1920, where he spent the rest of his childhood and attended school where he excelled athletically. During high school, Bowler ran track, and set the Idaho state record for the half-mile, which remained unbroken for twelve years. Although his obituary claimed he reached the semifinals of the 1932 Los Angeles Olympics, this is not true and he never participated in either the Olympic Games or the 1932 US Olympic trials.

In 1931, Bowler entered the University of Idaho, staying there until 1935 without graduating. While at the university, Bowler joined the Phi Gamma Delta fraternity, through which he met Thomas Collins, later the father of singer Judy Collins. The two became close friends, often singing and drinking together. As a result of their friendship, Bowler became the godfather of Judy Collins, who later described his singing voice as "magnificent."

== Musical career ==
After leaving the University of Idaho, Bowler moved to Chicago to pursue his dream of becoming a professional singer, and worked with a voice coach in 1935 and 1936. He then moved to New York City and joined the Robert Shaw Chorale. Bowler was a soloist in the group for three years, but was one of the first members to leave, in 1939. After leaving the chorale, Bowler became the headline singer of the McCormick Cruise line on its voyage to South America.

While working on the McCormick line, Bowler first met J.D. Salinger, who worked as a staff boy on the same ship. The two quickly developed a friendship, riding bicycles together while in port and discussing their hopes for the future. During one of their conversations, Salinger told Bowler that he hoped to become a writer and would use the name Holden in one of his future books. In 1951, Salinger finished his book Catcher in the Rye and wrote to Bowler, informing him that the book's protagonist, Holden Caulfield was named for him. Ann Bowler, Holden's wife, later recounted that Salinger told Bowler: "what you like about Holden (Caulfield) is taken from you, and what you don't like about him, I made up."

== Military and business career ==
At the beginning of World War II Bowler left singing and enlisted in the Army, where he was commissioned as a second lieutenant. Bowler was promoted to the rank of captain before the D-Day landings and served in the section responsible for coordinating the logistics of the attack. After D-Day, he "oversaw all German and Italian Prisoners of War brought to England." While in England, he also met Ann Marion Childs, whom he married in 1945; the two went on to have four children. After the war, Bowler stayed in the United States Army Reserve, retiring in 1962 with the rank of lieutenant colonel.

In the 1950s, Bowler moved to Denver, where he entered business. He initially sold advertisements for a local radio station, KYMR-AM, then joined the Halclark Advertising agency in Denver. In 1961, he started his own advertising firm, Bowler Associates. Starting in 1969, he also worked with the Denver school district, doing environmental education. He retired in 1971 and moved to Bliss, Idaho where he died in 2001 at the age of 89.

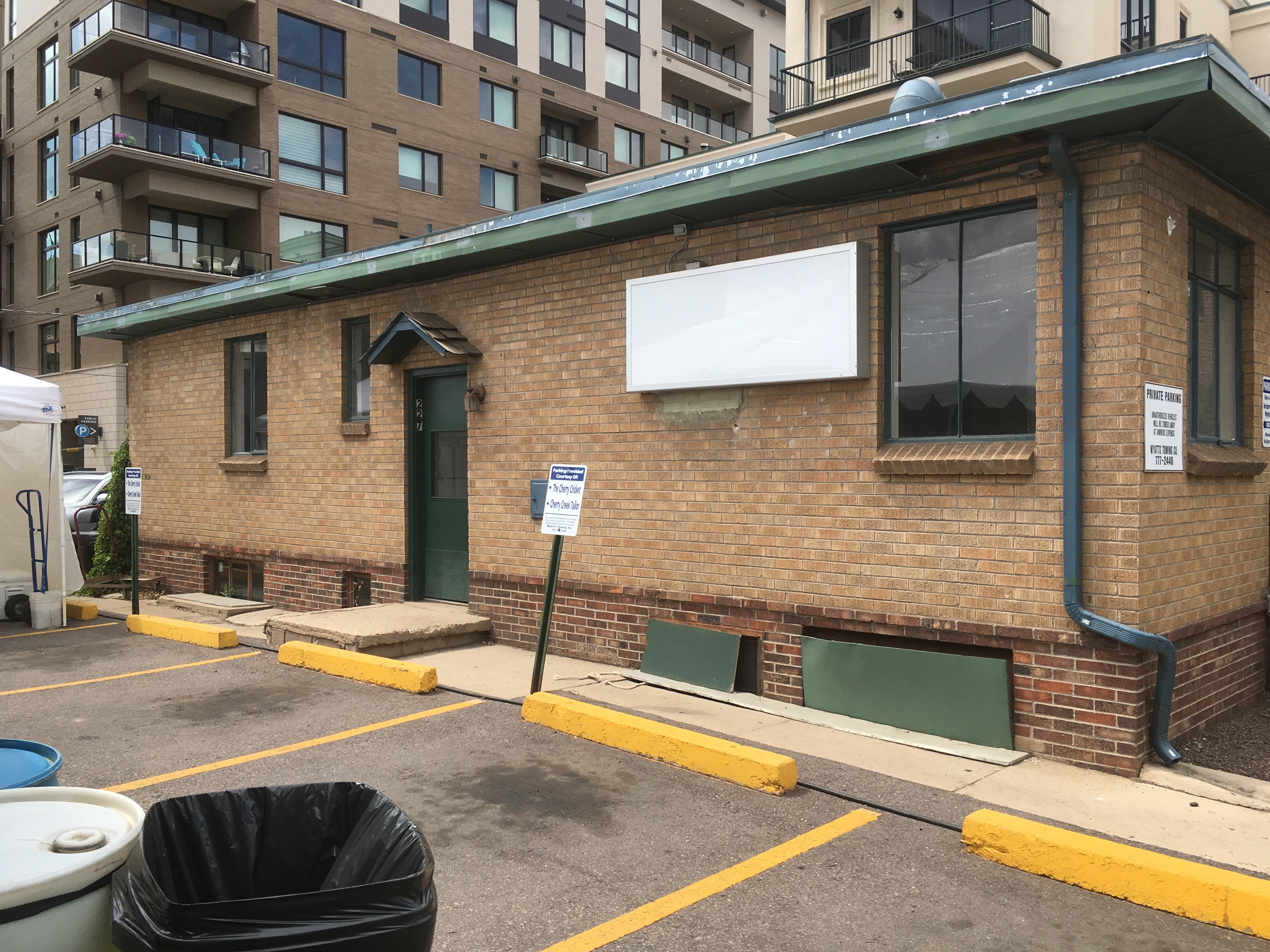
227 Clayton Street in Denver. Former location of Bowler Associates.

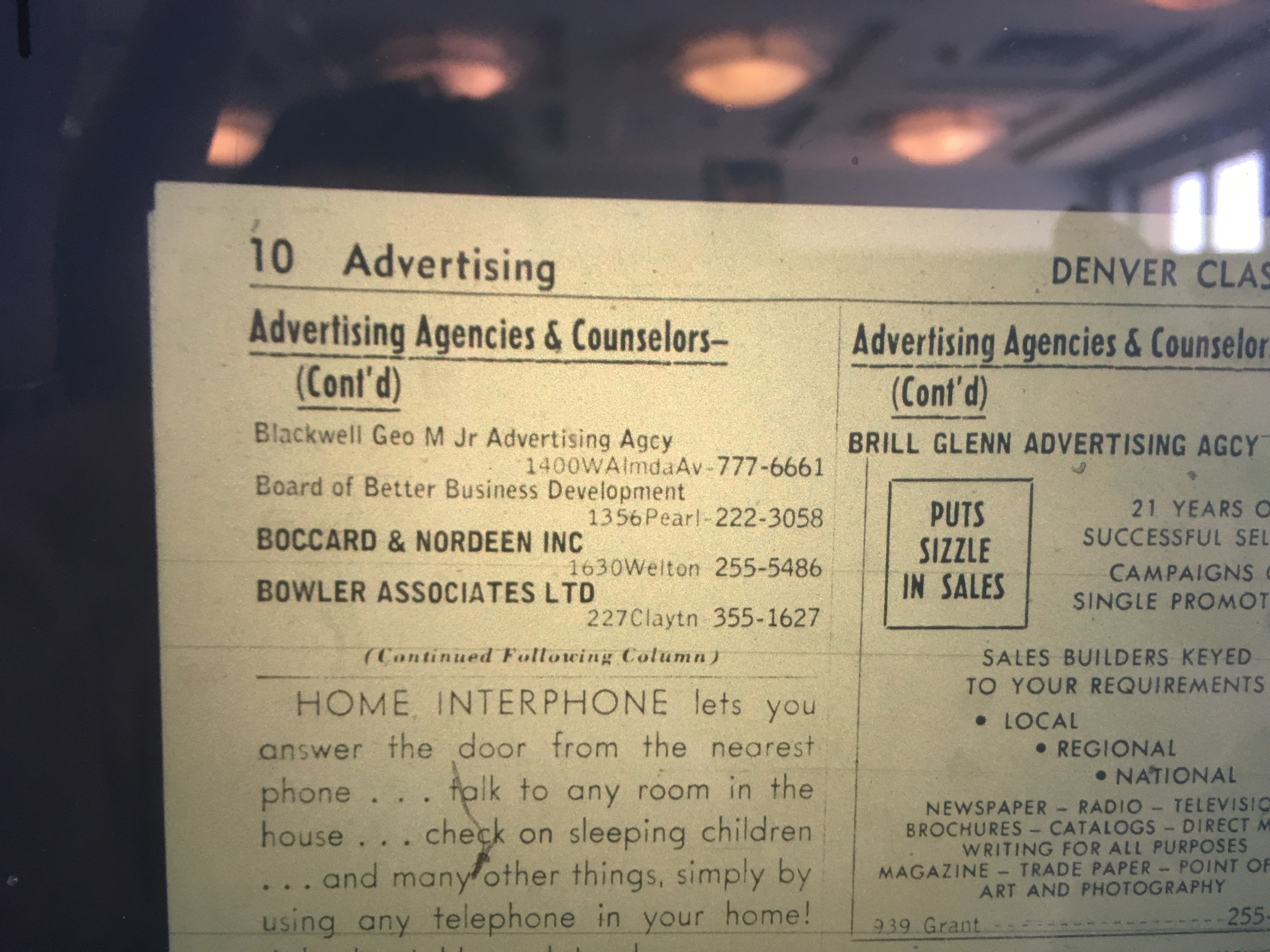
Bowler Associates 1963 Denver yellow pages phone book listing.
