= Bowler Hill =

Summit in Missouri, United States

Coordinates: 38°53′16″N 94°23′40″W

Bowler Hill is a summit in Jackson County in the U.S. state of Missouri. It has a peak elevation of 1,086 ft (331 m).

Bowler Hill was named after J. O. F. Bowler, the original owner of the site.
