= Bowls (photograph) =

Photograph by Paul Strand

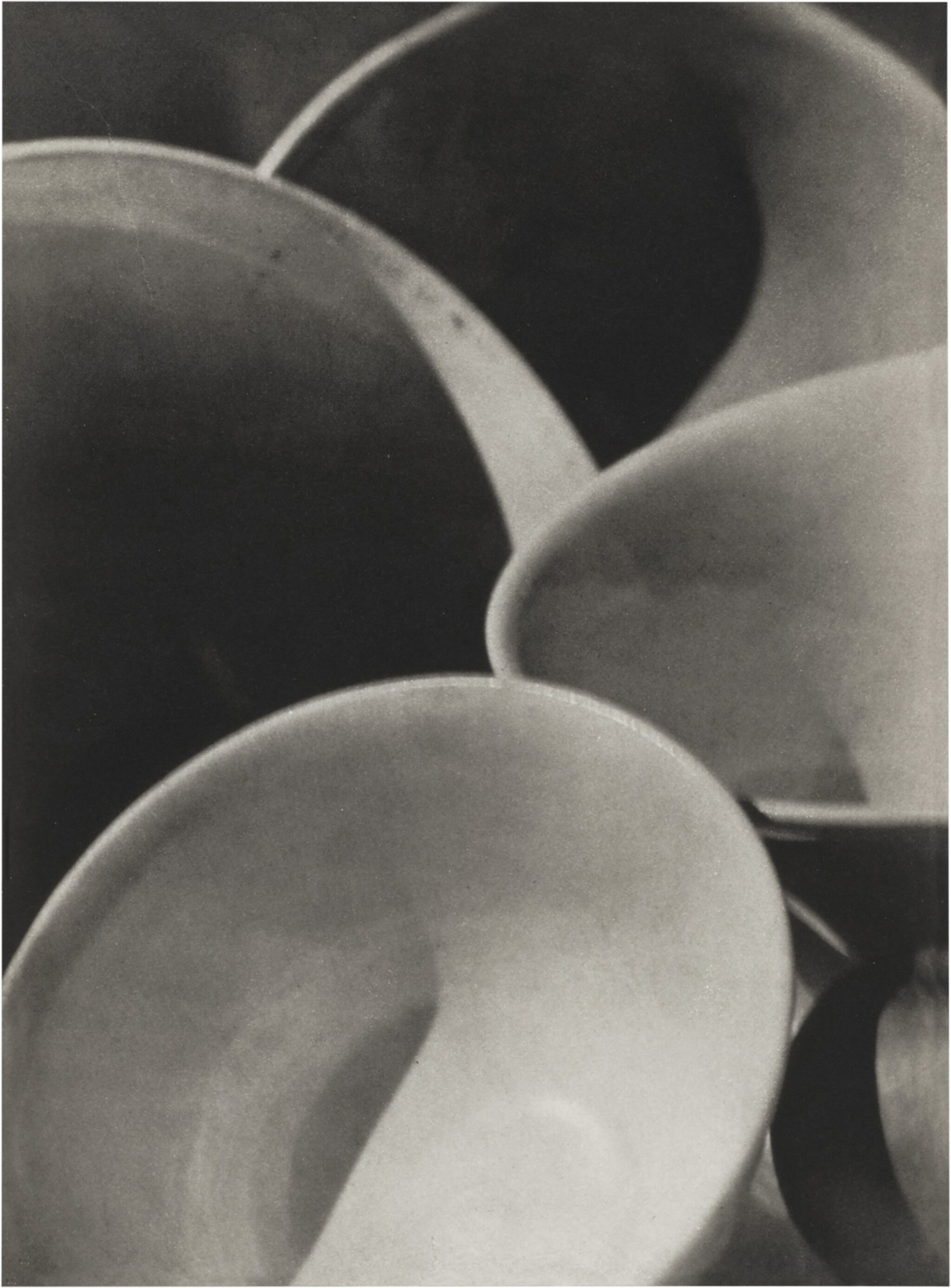
Bowls (1916) by Paul Strand

Bowls, also known as Abstraction, Bowls, is a black and white photograph taken by Paul Strand in 1916. The photograph incorporates elements of Cubism and Abstractionism, exemplifying his artistic style at the time.

== History and description ==
Strand was motivated by the work of Cubist painters and sculptors like Pablo Picasso, Georges Braque and Constantin Brâncuși, to create photographs of objects inspired by their geometric forms. In this picture, one of several taken during a stay in Twin Lakes, Connecticut, he captured a close-up of four ordinary kitchen bowls. The photograph highlights their circular shapes, and the effect of light and shadow on these objects. The overlapping composition becomes almost abstract and not immediately recognizable at first glance. Mike North stated that in this picture, "soft focus and composition clearly collude to dilute the referential just enough to make four bowls into a work of art".

Strand's geometrical photographs were published in the magazine Camera Work, in 1917, and were praised by Alfred Stieglitz himself, who stated, "The work is brutally direct; devoid of all flim-flam; devoid of trickery and of any 'ism'; devoid of any attempt to mystify an ignorant public, including the photographers themselves."

== Public collections ==
There are prints of this photograph in several public collections, including the Metropolitan Museum of Art, in New York, the National Gallery of Art, in Washington, D.C., the Philadelphia Museum of Art, The Cleveland Museum of Art, and the J. Paul Getty Museum, in Los Angeles.
