= James Bowler =

James Bowler may refer to:

- James Bowler (politician) (1875–1957), American politician
- James Bowler (civil servant) (born 1973), British civil servant
- Jim Bowler (born 1930), Australian geologist
