= Joseph Bowler =

American artist and illustrator (1928–2016)

- Born: September 4, 1928; Forest Hills, New York, U.S.
- Died: November 14, 2016 (aged 88); Hilton Head Island, South Carolina, U.S.
- Occupations: artist, illustrator

Joseph Bowler Jr. (September 4, 1928 – November 14, 2016) was an American artist and illustrator.

== Biography ==
Joseph Bowler Jr. was born on September 4, 1928. He was a regular illustrator for the likes of Cosmopolitan Magazine and Ladies' Home Journal in the Second Illustrative Golden Age after the Second World War. In 1958, Bowler was stricken with polio.

An apprentice of the Charles E. Cooper Art Studio in New York, Bowler was named The Artists' Guild of New York Artist of the Year in 1967. The award was a break for Bowler, who between 1968 and 1971 illustrated Rose Fitzgerald Kennedy for Ladies' Home Journal, and David Eisenhower and his wife Julie for The Saturday Evening Post.

Bowler was named in the Society of Illustrators Hall of Fame in 1992.

Joseph Bowler died at his home on Hilton Head Island, South Carolina, on November 14, 2016. He was 88.
