= Max L. Bowler =

American politician and businessman

Max L. Bowler (March 9, 1881–April 26, 1949) was an American politician and businessman.

Bowler was born in Edwardsville, Illinois. In 1883, he moved with his family to East St. Louis, Illinois. Bowler went to the East St. Louis public schools and took commercial training at Perkins and Herpel Business School in St. Louis, Missouri. Bowler was involved with the livestock business at the National Stock Yards in Illinois. He served on the St. Clair Board of Supervisors and was a Republican. Bowler served in the Illinois House of Representatives in 1941 and 1942. He died at his home in East St. Louis, Illinois from heart disease.
