= English–Latin football rivalry =

High school sports rivalry in Boston, Massachusetts, U.S.

Since 1887, two of the oldest public schools in the United States, the Boston Latin School and English High School of Boston, have faced off in an annual football competition which now takes place on Thanksgiving day at Harvard Stadium. The rivalry had been the longest-running continuous high school football rivalry in the U.S., until the streak was broken in the 2020 season; the game was played every year, even during World War I, the Spanish flu, and World War II, but high school football was banned in Massachusetts in 2020 as a reaction to the COVID-19 pandemic in Massachusetts. It remains the fifth-longest all-time behind Phillips Academy versus Phillips Exeter Academy; Wellesley, Massachusetts versus Needham, Massachusetts; New London, Connecticut versus Norwich Free Academy in Norwich, Connecticut; Germantown Academy vs. William Penn Charter School; and Lawrenceville School vs. The Hill School.

== Stats ==
The series began with both teams' formation in 1887. Prior to 1887, English and Latin had fielded a unified team.

Until the late 1960s, the rivalry was fairly even. From 1967 through 2019, Latin dominated the series, winning 50 of the 53 contests in that span, leading all time 83–39–13. Latin's dominance could be considered at its zenith in the 1970s when they held English to only 28 points for the entire decade amid a 14-game winning streak; two fifteen-game streaks followed. Much of the series has been decided in blowout victories by one side or the other, with 63 of the 134 games being decided by shutouts and 39 of the contests ending in 20-point or more victories. The last such blowout was in 2015. English has since regained competitiveness; the late 2010s contests were narrower losses, and since resuming play after the pandemic, they have won three of the most recent four contests (including its first consecutive victories in the series since 1963).

Ten of the games ended in scoreless ties, the last such game in 1945; ties have largely been eliminated with the introduction of overtime.

	English	Latin
Games Played	138	
Highest Win Streak	4 (1925–1928)	15 (1982–1996, 1998–2012)
Current Streak	English, 2	
Most Points Scored in a Winning Game	66 (2021)	54 (2010)
Most Points Scored in a Losing Game	25 (1953)	44 (2022)
Fewest Points Scored in a Winning Game	4 (1895)	4 (1894)
Shutout Victories	19	33
Most Points Scored in a Shutout	39 (1961)	44 (2004)
Largest Margin of Victory	39 (1961)	44 (2004)
Smallest Margin of Victory	1 (1920, 1930)	1 (1901, 1912, 1915, 1934, 1993)

== Game results ==
Latin victories	English victories	Tie games

No.	Date	Winner	Score
1	1887	Latin	16–0
2	1888	Latin	38–0
3	1889	English	10–4
4	1890	English	22–0
5	1891	Latin	14–10
6	1892	English	12–10
7	1893	English	6–0
8	1894	Latin	4–0
9	1895	English	4–0
10	1896	English	6–0
11	1897	English	44–6
12	1898	Latin	5–0
13	1899	English	23–0
14	1900	Latin	12–0
15	1901	Latin	6–5
16	1902	Latin	25–0
17	1903	Latin	5–0
18	1904	Tie	5–5
19	1905	Tie	0–0
20	1906	English	10–0
21	1907	English	5–0
22	1908	Tie	6–6
23	1909	Tie	0–0
24	1910	Latin	9–0
25	1911	Tie	0–0
26	1912	Latin	7–6
27	1913	English	21–0
28	1914	Tie	3–3
29	1915	Latin	14–13
30	1916	English	13–0
31	1917	English	13–0
32	1918	Latin	28–0
33	1919	Tie	0–0
34	1920	English	7–6
35	1921	Tie	0–0
36	1922	Latin	20–6
37	1923	Tie	0–0
38	1924	Latin	7–0
39	1925	English	7–0
40	1926	English	6–0
41	1927	English	20–13
42	1928	English	18–0
43	1929	Latin	13–6
44	1930	English	14–13
45	1931	Latin	6–0
46	1932	Latin	18–7
47	1933	English	20–7

No.	Date	Winner	Score
48	1934	Latin	13–12
49	1935	English	14–0
50	1936	Latin	13–0
51	1937	Tie	0–0
52	1938	English	6–0
53	1939	Tie	0–0
54	1940	Latin	19–12
55	1941	Latin	19–0
56	1942	English	10–0
57	1943	Tie	0–0
58	1944	English	13–6
59	1945	Tie	0–0
60	1946	English	19–0
61	1947	English	26–13
62	1948	Latin	19–0
63	1949	Latin	19–0
64	1950	English	41–30
65	1951	English	30–0
66	1952	Latin	30–12
67	1953	Latin	31–25
68	1954	Latin	20–6
69	1955	English	20–14
70	1956	Latin	19–12
71	1957	English	26–20
72	1958	Latin	26–24
73	1959	Latin	22–6
74	1960	Latin	20–16
75	1961	English	39–0
76	1962	English	32–6
77	1963	English	18–12
78	1964	Latin	24–22
79	1965	Latin	24–12
80	1966	English	20–18
81	1967	Latin	14–0
82	1968	Latin	33–12
83	1969	Latin	40–0
84	1970	Latin	12–8
85	1971	Latin	6–0
86	1972	Latin	40–0
87	1973	Latin	35–8
88	1974	Latin	42–0
89	1975	Latin	24–6
90	1976	Latin	11–6
91	1977	Latin	23–0
92	1978	Latin	34–0
93	1979	Latin	22–0
94	1980	Latin	20–0

No.	Date	Winner	Score
95	1981	English	14–2
96	1982	Latin	15–6
97	1983	Latin	21–6
98	1984	Latin	43–0
99	1985	Latin	10–6
100	1986	Latin	40–6
101	1987	Latin	14–6
102	1988	Latin	20–13
103	1989	Latin	22–6
104	1990	Latin	14–6
105	1991	Latin	19–0
106	1992	Latin	41–0
107	1993	Latin	7–6
108	1994	Latin	41–0
109	1995	Latin	36–12
110	1996	Latin	31–6
111	1997	English	8–6
112	1998	Latin	34–6
113	1999	Latin	42–20
114	2000	Latin	14–0
115	2001	Latin	46–6
116	2002	Latin	38–7
117	2003	Latin	36–7
118	2004	Latin	44–0
119	2005	Latin	36–12
120	2006	Latin	14–0
121	2007	Latin	33–6
122	2008	Latin	36–0
123	2009	Latin	27–16
124	2010	Latin	54–12
125	2011	Latin	50–0
126	2012	Latin	44–15
127	2013	English	14–12
128	2014	Latin	25–8
129	2015	Latin	28–6
130	2016	Latin	34–20
131	2017	Latin	22–14
132	2018	Latin	20–16
133	2019	Latin	16–6
134	2021	English	66–42
135	2022	English	52–44
136	2023	Latin	19–6
137	2024	English	28–12
138	2025	English	40–30
Series: Latin leads 84–41–13

== See also ==
- Lists of high school football rivalries
