= Ann Patricia Bowling =

British and Irish sociologist (born 1951)

Professor Ann Patricia Bowling
- Born: 7 May 1951 (age 75); Surrey, England
- Citizenship: British; Irish
- Occupation: Research professor
- Years active: 1978 to present
- Known for: Research on quality of life for older people
- Title: Professor
- Board member of: Ageing Research and Health Expectations (formerly), International Journal of Ageing and Human Development (formerly)
- Awards: BMA Medical Book Awards – Highly Commended on Basis of Medicine 1998, 2015; Fellowship of Faculty of Public Health, Royal College of Physicians (2006)

Academic background
- Education: Lowestoft Grammar School
- Alma mater: Universities of London and Wales
- Thesis: Delegation in General Practice (1981)
- Doctoral advisor: Professor Roy Mapes

Academic work
- Discipline: Sociologist
- Sub-discipline: Public Health Sociology, Social Gerontology
- School or tradition: Sociology and Anthropology
- Institutions: University of Southampton
- Main interests: Ageing, quality of life, inequalities in access to health care
- Website: U. of Southampton webpage

Ann Patricia Bowling (born 7 May 1951) is a British and Irish sociologist and academic, specializing in research on ageing, quality of life, and research methods. Bowling developed the internationally recognized Older People's Quality of Life questionnaire (OPQOL). Bowling was most recently Professor of Health Sciences, University of Southampton (2012–17), where she is now visiting professor.

== Work ==
Previously Bowling was Professor of Ageing at St George's, University of London (2010–11), Professor of Health Services Research at University College London (1995–2010), Senior Lecturer promoted to Reader at Barts and The London School of Medicine and Dentistry (1986–1995) and joint Senior Lecturer at the London School of Hygiene & Tropical Medicine (1988–91), following several research posts.

Bowling's main work has focused on research and policy regarding quality of life in older age, and research methods in public health. She authored widely cited textbooks on research methods in public health Measuring Health: A Review of Quality of Life Measurement Scales and Research Methods in Health: Investigating Health and Health Services. Both have gone through four editions.

Bowling has been a member of various editorial boards, including the International Journal of Aging and Human Development.

== Honours ==
In July 2006, Bowling was elected Fellow of the Faculty of Public Health, of the Royal College of Physicians of the United Kingdom. Measuring Health won Highly Commended in the Basis of Medicine section in the 1998 British Medical Association Medical Book Competition. Research Methods in Health won Highly Commended in Basis of Medicine section in the 2015 British Medical Association Medical Book Awards.

== Academic works ==
=== Books (selected) ===
- Bowling, Ann (2017). Measuring health: a review of subjective health, well-being and quality of life measurement scales (4th ed.). London: Open Univ Press. ISBN 978-0-335-26194-9. OCLC 951645229.
- Bowling, Ann (2014). Research methods in health: Investigating health and health services (4th ed.). Milton Keynes. ISBN 978-0-335-26275-5. OCLC 887254158.
- Bowling, Ann Patricia (2023). Research methods in health: Investigating health and health services (5th ed.). Maidenhead Open Univ Press McGraw Hill. ISBN 978-0-335-25093-6.

=== Journal articles (selected) ===
- Bowling, Ann; Dieppe, Paul (22 December 2005). "What is successful ageing and who should define it?". BMJ. 331 (7531): 1548–1551. doi:10.1136/bmj.331.7531.1548. ISSN 0959-8138. PMC 1322264. PMID 16373748.
- Bowling, A.; Seetai, S.; Morris, R.; Ebrahim, S. (26 March 2007). "Quality of life among older people with poor functioning. The influence of perceived control over life" (PDF). Age and Ageing. 36 (3): 310–315. doi:10.1093/ageing/afm023. ISSN 0002-0729. PMID 17387124.
- Bowling, A.; Grundy, E. (13 November 2008). "Differentials in mortality up to 20 years after baseline interview among older people in East London and Essex". Age and Ageing. 38 (1): 51–55. doi:10.1093/ageing/afn220. ISSN 0002-0729. PMID 18974236.
- Bowling, A. (15 July 2009). "Predictors of mortality among a national sample of elderly widowed people: analysis of 28-year mortality rates". Age and Ageing. 38 (5): 527–530. doi:10.1093/ageing/afp108. ISSN 0002-0729. PMID 19608548.
- Bowling, Ann; Stenner, Paul (1 March 2011). "Which measure of quality of life performs best in older age? A comparison of the OPQOL, CASP-19 and WHOQOL-OLD". Journal of Epidemiology & Community Health. 65 (3): 273–280. doi:10.1136/jech.2009.087668. ISSN 0143-005X. PMC 3034083. PMID 20719807.
- Bowling, Ann; Pikhartova, Jitka; Dodgeon, Brian (2 December 2016). "Is mid-life social participation associated with cognitive function at age 50? Results from the British National Child Development Study (NCDS)". BMC Psychology. 4 (1): 58. doi:10.1186/s40359-016-0164-x. ISSN 2050-7283. PMC 5134123. PMID 27908287.
