= John Andrew Bowler =

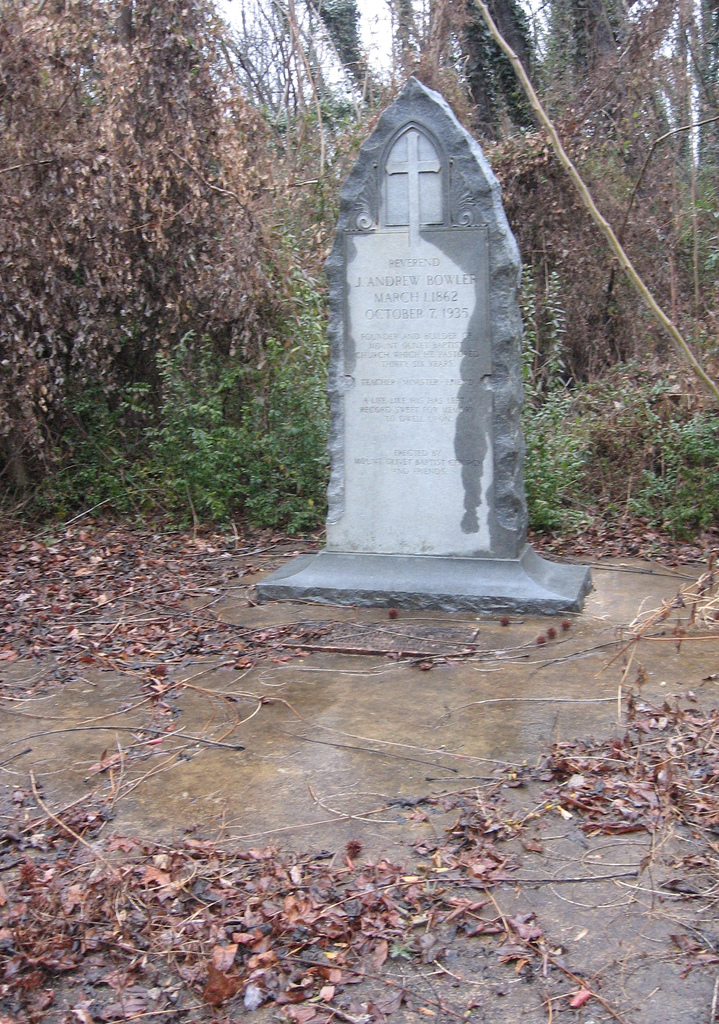
Grave of Rev. J. Andrew Bowler

John Andrew Bowler (March 1, 1862 – October 7, 1935) was an American educator and Baptist minister. He was the first minister of the Mt. Olivet Baptist Church in Richmond, Virginia and was one of the organizers for the first school for African Americans in Church Hill. He died on October 7, 1935, and is buried in the historic Evergreen Cemetery in Richmond, Virginia.

His former students include Delegate James S. Christian, Jr., who described Bowler as an "outstanding teacher".
