= Shaun Bowler =

British academic

- Born: June 21, 1958 (age 67)
- Education: Washington University in St. Louis
- Scientific career
- Fields: Political science
- Institutions: University of California, Riverside
- Thesis: Voter perceptions and party strategies: An empirical approach (1988)
- Doctoral advisor: Robert H. Salisbury

Shaun Bowler (born June 21, 1958) is Distinguished Professor & Dean of the Graduate Division in the Department of Political Science at the University of California, Riverside.
