= Lists of high school football rivalries =

For a list of high school football rivalries, see:

- List of high school football rivalries more than 100 years old; or
- List of high school football rivalries less than 100 years old
