= Turkey bowling =

Bowling sport

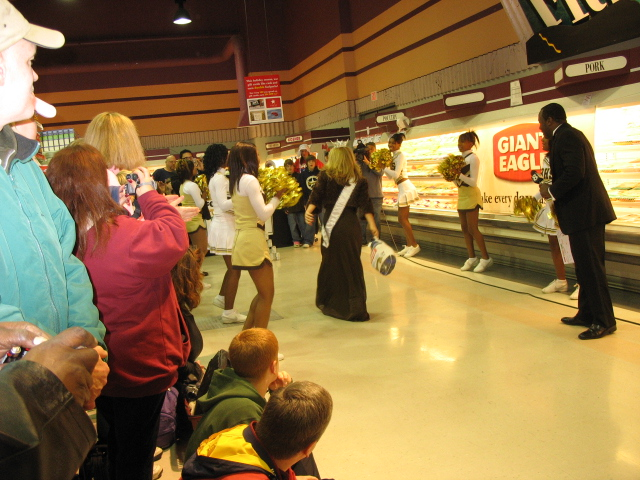
Miss Ohio 2006 bowls a turkey in South Euclid, Ohio

Turkey bowling is a sport which is based on ordinary bowling, played with a frozen turkey and 10 liquid-filled plastic beverage bottles. The turkey is bowled like a bowling ball down a smooth surface such as ice or a soap-covered sheet of painter's plastic, striking the bottles as if they were bowling pins. The sport is commonly associated with Thanksgiving.

The original variant involves turkey bowling in an aisle of a grocery store. Derrick Johnson, who worked as a grocery clerk at a Newport Beach Lucky's branch, claims to have invented the sport in 1988 while observing a manager slide a frozen turkey across the floor and accidentally topple a soda bottle. Johnson became a self-appointed commissioner of the "Poultry Bowlers Association" and codified the rules and terminology, such as "the fowl line" (cf. "foul line"), "the gobbler" (three strikes in a row; cf. turkey (bowling)), "the Butterball" (a gutterball) and "the wishbone" (a 7-10 split).

A variant of turkey bowling popularized by television station WJW in Cleveland, Ohio uses stacked canned goods instead of soft drink bottles. The WJW version ("Fox 8 Turkey Bowl") is a multiple-round, one-frame knockout tournament televised in segments during WJW's Thanksgiving morning newscast. The event has been held since 1999, including a celebrity invitational (won by Bernie Kosar) in 2023 and a 25th anniversary tournament of champions in 2024.

== Controversy ==
Animal rights proponents, who oppose the use of animals in sports, claim that turkey bowling is disrespectful to animals and sends mixed messages which may encourage violence to animals or people. Another objection is perceived disrespect to the central attribute of Thanksgiving. In 2003, an upcoming event for the title of UK Great Turkey Bowling Champion at Manchester Evening News Arena was protested against by animal rights campaigners; as a result, plastic turkeys were used instead of real frozen turkeys. In 2007, an animal sanctuary rescued a live turkey, which was in a cage, from a turkey bowling event in New York state.
