= Baltimore City College Knights =

Overview of athletics at Baltimore City College

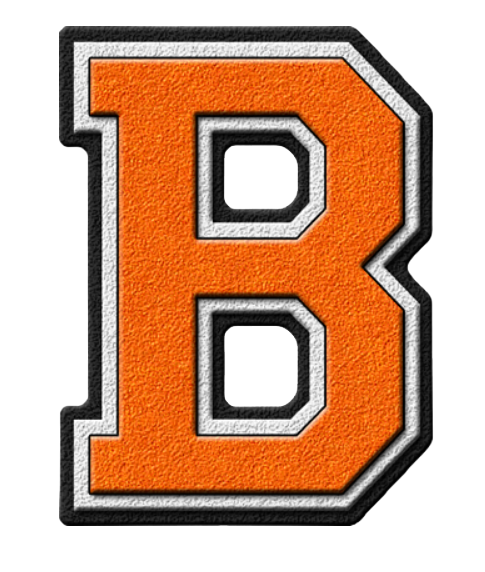
- School: Baltimore City College
- Nickname: Knights (alternate: Collegians)
- Association: MPSSAA
- Conference: Class 3A
- Athletic director: Rolynda Contee
- Location: Baltimore, Maryland
- Varsity teams: 24 Varsity (13-Girls, 11-Boys) & 6 Junior Varsity
- Football stadium: George Petrides Stadium at Alumni Field
- Basketball arena: B.C.C. Athletic Center
- Baseball stadium: B.C.C. Baseball Field
- Softball stadium: B.C.C. Softball Field
- Soccer stadium: George Petrides Stadium at Alumni Field
- Aquatics center: B.C.C. Natatorium
- Outdoor track and field venue: George Petrides Stadium at Alumni Field
- Volleyball arena: B.C.C. Auxiliary Gymnasium
- Colors: Orange and Black
- Mascot: The Black Knight
- Website: baltimorecitycollegeathletics.com

The Baltimore City College Knights, or alternatively, the Collegians, are the varsity and junior varsity interscholastic athletic teams representing Baltimore City College, a public college preparatory secondary school, located in Baltimore, Maryland. The school interscholastic athletics program consists of 24 varsity teams and competes in the MPSSAA Class 3A. The school colors are orange and black, and its mascot is the Black Knight. City College teams were all-male from the school’s founding in 1839 until coeducation began in 1978.

Organized athletics at B.C.C. date back to the 1870s with informal football and baseball contests. By 1895, the school was fielding varsity teams against universities such as the United States Naval Academy, Maryland, St. John’s College, and Swarthmore College. Between 1894 and 1920, the school’s lacrosse team played against college powerhouses including Johns Hopkins and the U.S. Naval Academy. In January 1896, the school formed its first basketball team, making B.C.C. one of the earliest high schools in Maryland to sponsor the sport.

Since joining the MPSSAA in 1993, City has captured championships at the district, regional, and state levels in nearly every sport it sponsors. The athletic department is especially noted for its achievements in football, boys’ and girls’ basketball, cross country, swimming, tennis, and lacrosse. The Black Knights have won championships in 20 different sports all-time and remain one of Maryland’s most decorated public high school athletic programs.

== Sports Sponsored ==
The B.C.C. athletic department sponsors 24 varsity interscholastic sports teams sanctioned by the MPSSAA. The following table lists the school’s current varsity team sports, organized by season and gender.

Season	Boys' Sports	Girls' Sports
Fall	Cross Country; Football; Soccer	Cross Country; Field Hockey; Soccer; Volleyball
Winter	Basketball; Indoor Track and Field; Swimming; Wrestling	Basketball; Cheerleading; Dance; Indoor Track and Field; Swimming
Spring	Baseball; Lacrosse; Outdoor Track and Field; Tennis	Badminton; Lacrosse; Outdoor Track and Field; Softball; Tennis

In addition to varsity athletics, B.C.C. fields junior varsity teams in select sports such as football, boys' basketball, and girls’ basketball. While the school no longer sponsors bowling, fencing, golf, or ice hockey, it retains historic titles in each of those sports.

== History ==
=== 19th Century ===
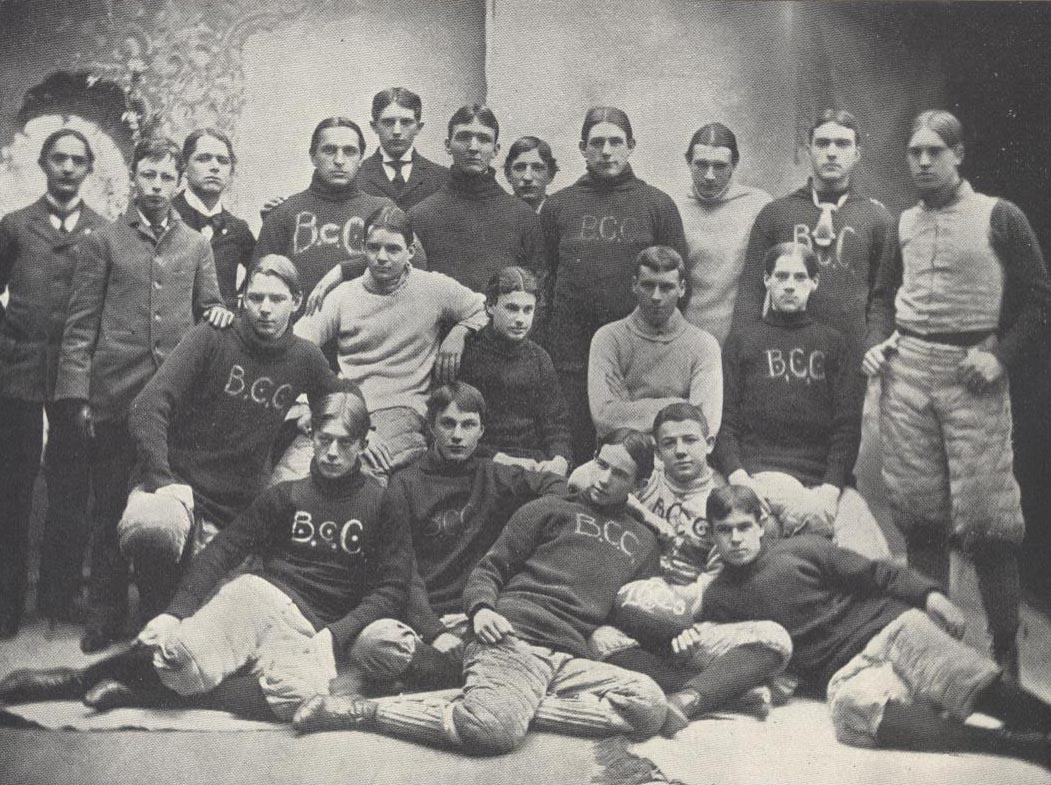
Members of the 1895 Baltimore City College football team

City College has one of the oldest and most storied high school athletics programs in the United States. The school’s organized athletic history began in the mid-19th century, with the formation of informal football and baseball clubs. In 1895, the Knights established formal varsity teams and competed against local collegiate opponents, including Navy, Maryland, and Johns Hopkins.

During this early period, B.C.C. was a member of the Maryland Intercollegiate Football Association (MIFA), where it competed as the only high school among a field of colleges and universities. By 1910, Professor W. M. Dame was serving as the school’s director of physical training, overseeing team schedules and athletic development.

For the duration of the 20th century, City College’s sports teams played regular games and matches against collegiate foes Johns Hopkins and Navy, helping to shape the early American game.

=== 20th Century ===
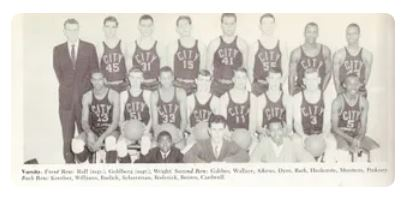
The 1963 MSA Conference championship team pose for a photo with then-head coach Jerry Phipps.

In 1919, City College principal Dr. Philip H. Edwards led the founding of the Maryland Scholastic Association (MSA), which remained in the league until 1993. During this period, the athletic department achieved success across multiple sports, establishing rivalries with other MSA founding members including area private schools Calvert Hall College, Park School of Baltimore and Mount Saint Joseph, and Baltimore Polytechnic Institute, the Knights' public school arch-rival. B.C.C. opposed the 1992 vote to withdraw from the MSA, citing the league's competitive integrity and tradition.

Notable athletes from this era include:

- Max Bishop, Class of 1921 (MLB second baseman)
- Thom Gatewood, Class of 1968 (All-American wide receiver)
- Charley Eckman, Class of 1940 (NBA coach and referee)
- Numerous inductees to the National Lacrosse Hall of Fame

City College also became nationally recognized for its football program during this period. The 1934–1941 teams posted a 54-game unbeaten streak, still one of the longest in Maryland state history.

=== 21st Century ===
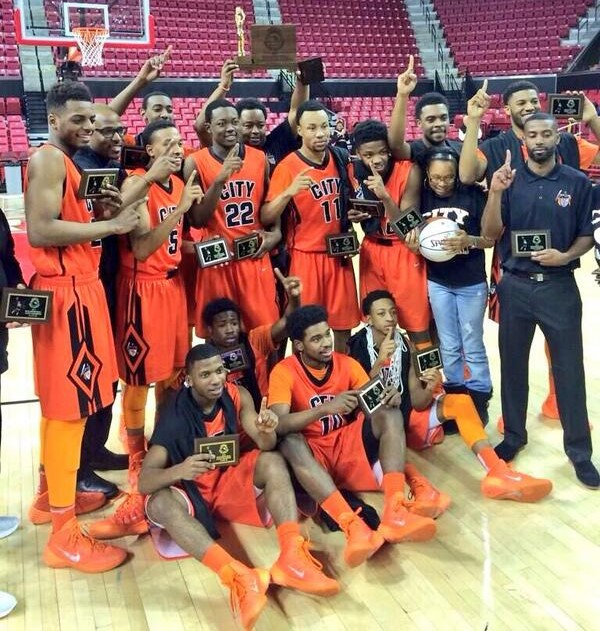
The 2013-14 boys basketball team and coaching staff pose for a picture after winning the MPSSAA 3A state championship in 2014.

In 1992, Baltimore City Public Schools voted to withdraw from the MSA and join the Maryland Public Secondary Schools Athletic Association (MPSSAA), aligning with the statewide public school system beginning in 1993. While City College formally joined MPSSAA along with other public high schools, its leadership and alumni community expressed reservations about the departure from MSA, which they viewed as a competitive, academically rigorous, and tradition-rich league.

Since 1993, the Knights have won six state championships in the following sports:

- Boys' Basketball (2009, 2010, 2014, 2023, 2025)
- Girls' Basketball (2009)

== Traditions ==
=== City–Poly rivalry ===
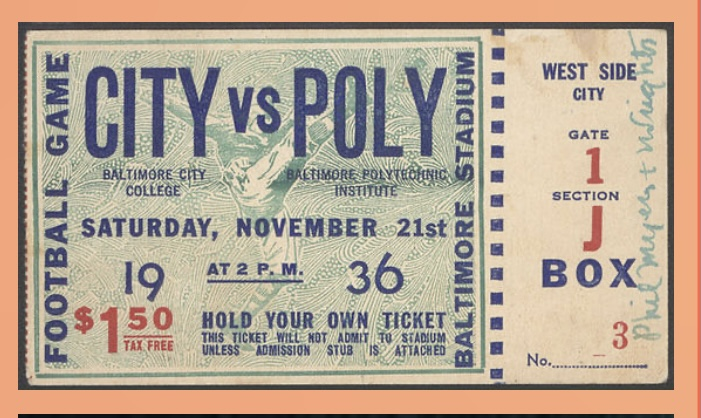
An admission ticket to the 1936 City–Poly game.

The City–Poly football rivalry, commonly known as the City–Poly Game, is high school football rivalry between the Baltimore City College Black Knights and the Baltimore Polytechnic Institute Engineers. It is the oldest high school football rivalry in the state of Maryland and the second-oldest between public high schools in the United States, following the English-Boston Latin rivalry, which began in 1887.

The rivalry began in 1889 with a victory by City’s reserve team over Poly at Clifton Park. Since then, the two programs have met 135 times. As of 2026, City leads the all-time series 66–63–6. In 2025, Poly beat City for the first time since 2012, breaking a 12-game losing streak to the Knights.

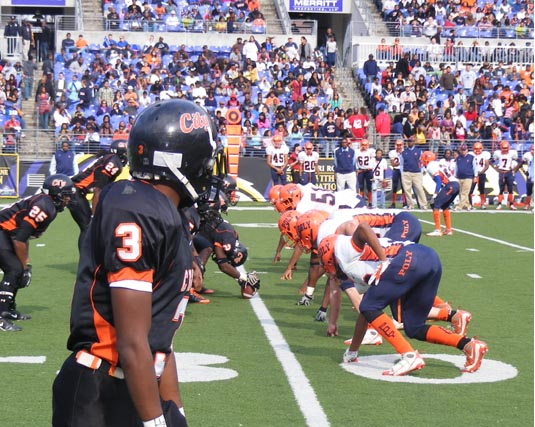
City vs. Poly, 2008 at M&T Bank Stadium

Over the decades, the rivalry has featured some of the most prominent names in Maryland high school football history, including Harry Lawrence, Bob Lumsden, George Petrides,"Longtime City football coach George Petrides retires". August 5, 2015. and George Young. More than 25 alumni of the City–Poly game have gone on to play in the National Football League, including 14 from City College.

From 1922 to 1996, The Game was held at Baltimore Memorial Stadium, then the largest venue in the city. In the late 1990s, it moved to M&T Bank Stadium, home of the Baltimore Ravens, before transitioning to Hughes Stadium on the campus of Morgan State University in 2018.

== Notable alumni ==
For generations, City College has produced scholar-athletes who go on to become collegiate, professional, and Olympic athletes. The list below notes alumni who have performed athletically at the highest levels.

=== National Football League (NFL) ===
National Football League (NFL)
Name	Class	Position	NFL teams	Years active
Malik Hamm	2017	LB	Baltimore Ravens	2023–present
Charles Tapper	2012	DE	Dallas Cowboys, New York Jets	2017
Bryant Johnson	1999	WR	Arizona Cardinals, San Francisco 49ers, Detroit Lions, Houston Texans	2003–2011
Tom Gatewood	1968	TE/WR	New York Giants	1972–1973
Ara Person	1966	TE	St. Louis Cardinals	1972
John Sykes	1967	WR	San Diego Chargers	1972
Bob Baldwin	1962	FB	Baltimore Colts	1966
George Ragsdale	1968	RB/WR	Tampa Bay Buccaneers	1977–1979
Nick Campofreda	1938	C/T	Washington Redskins	1944
Art Brandau	1938	C/G	Pittsburgh Steelers	1945–1946
John Wright	1938	B	Baltimore Colts	1947
Gil Meyer	1939	E/DE	Baltimore Colts	1947
Reid Lennon	1939	G/C/T	Washington Redskins, Los Angeles Dons	1945–1947

=== National Basketball Association (NBA) ===
National Basketball Association (NBA)
Name	Class	Position	NBA Teams	Years active
C.J. Fair	2008*	PF	Indiana Pacers (waived prior to regular season)	2014
Will Barton	2010*	SG	Portland Trail Blazers, Denver Nuggets, Washington Wizards, Toronto Raptors	2012–2023
Lee Dedmon	1966	F	Los Angeles Lakers	1971-1972

(*) transferred to a national basketball academy.

=== Major League Baseball (MLB) ===
Major League Baseball (MLB)
Name	Class	Position	MLB teams	Years active
Max Bishop	1921*	2B	Philadelphia Athletics, Boston Red Sox	1924–1935
Tommy Thomas	1918	P	Chicago White Sox	1926–1937
Johnny Neun	1921	1B	Detroit Tigers, New York Yankees	1925–1931

*Left school junior year

=== The Games of the Olympiad ===
Name	Class	Sport	Olympic Games	Role
William C. Schmeisser	1899	Lacrosse	1928 Amsterdam	Assistant Coach, U.S. National Team
Francis Pierpont Davis	Attended c.1898	Sailing (8 Metre class)	1932 Los Angeles	Gold Medalist, Crew – *Angelita*

== Notable Coaches ==
Head coach	Sport(s)	Years	Record	Championships	Notable Achievements
George Young	Football	1959–1967	60–11–2 (.927)	6 MSA titles	Future GM of the New York Giants (2x Super Bowl champion); later served as NFL SVP of Football Ops.
George Petrides	Football, Girls Basketball, Athletic Director	1975–2015 (Coach), 1985–2017 (AD)	257–144–1 (Football)	5 MSA titles (football), 1 MPSSAA state title (Girls’ Basketball)	Baltimore Sun Coach of the Year (1987, 1991); 3 undefeated football seasons; 46 years of service to BCC; retired as 2nd winningest football coach in state history.
George "Jerry" Phipps	Boys Basketball	1960–1968	133–27 (.831)	5 MSA titles	40-game win streak; back-to-back perfect seasons; led 1967 team to MSA tournament title.
Eugene Parker	Multi-sport (Boys Basketball, Baseball, Track & Field)	1969–1973 (Coach)	2 MSA Titles (Coach)	2 MSA titles (Boys Basketball)	First Black faculty member at City; coached & mentored 6,000+ students; succeeded Jerry Phipps as head boys basketball coach.
Mike Daniel	Boys Basketball	2005–2010 (City)	100–26 (.794) at City	2 MPSSAA State Titles, 2 MPSSAA Final Four appearances	Coached NBA players Carmelo Anthony and Will Barton; 566 career wins across four Maryland programs.
Omarr Smith	Boys Basketball	2017–present	147-33 (.816)	2 MPSSAA State Titles, 3 MPSSAA Final Four appearances	Led the Knights to two MPSSAA Final Four appearances as a player, was an assistant coach on the nationally-ranked 2013-14 Knights' (27-0) undefeated state championship team and head coach of the 2022-23 Knights' (28-0) undefeated state championship team.

== Championships ==
City College has won 280 team championships in nearly all varsity sports sponsored by the school. The following tables summarize championship success across all active and historic varsity sports at B.C.C.

=== Current Varsity Sports ===
Sport	MSA Titles	MPSSAA State	MPSSAA Regional	MPSSAA District	Total	Championship Seasons
Badminton	0	0	0	14	14	1993, 1995, 1996, 1997, 2004, 2005, 2006, 2007, 2008, 2009, 2011, 2012, 2013, 2014
Baseball	9	0	0	3	12	**1903**, **1915**, **1926**, **1934**, **1935**, **1936**, **1937**, **1938**, **1940**, **1942**, 1962, 1994, 2017, 2019
Boys' Basketball	13	5	10	3	31	**1916**, **1922**, **1923**, **1934**, **1935**, **1938**, **1939**, **1940**, **1961**, **1963**, **1965**, **1966**, **1967**, **1969**, 1997, 1998, 1999, **2009**, **2010**, 2013, **2014**, 2022, **2023**, **2025**
Girls' Basketball	0	1	3	3	7	2004, 2005, **2009**
Bocce	0	0	0	2	2	2013, 2014
Girls' Field Hockey	0	0	0	1	1	2025
Football	18	0	4	2	24	**1937**, **1938**, **1939**, **1940**, **1941**, **1942**, **1961**, **1964**, **1965**, **1966**, **1967**, **1968**, **1986**, **1987**, **1988**, **1991**, **1992**, 1996, 2005, 2006, 2023
Boys' Lacrosse	13	0	1	7	21	**1933**, **1934**, **1935**, **1941**, **1955**, **1957**, **1958**, **1959**, **1960**, **1961**, **1962**, **1984**, **1987**, 1993, 2008, 2009, 2010, 2015, 2019, 2021
Girls' Lacrosse	0	0	0	12	12	1998, 1999, 2000, 2009, 2011, 2013, 2014, 2015, 2016, 2017, 2018, 2019
Boys' Soccer	10	0	1	4	15	**1934**, **1935**, **1938**, **1939**, **1941**, **1963**, **1982**, **1985**, **1986**, **1987**, 1994, 2018, 2019, 2025
Girls' Soccer	0	0	0	3	3	2000, 2012, 2013
Softball	0	0	0	2	2	1994, 1996
Swimming	25	0	7	6	38	**1930**, **1931**, **1932**, **1933**, **1934**, **1935**, **1936**, **1937**, **1938**, **1939**, **1940**, **1941**, **1942**, **1943**, **1944**, **1946**, **1947**, **1949**, **1950**, **1951**, **1952**, **1953**, **1986**, **1987**, **1988**, **1989**, **1990**, 2007, 2008, 2010, 2011, 2012, 2013, 2019
Co-ed Tennis	0	0	0	7	7	1990, 1991, 1992, 2007, 2008, 2009, 2011
Volleyball	0	0	0	2	4	**1980**, **1982**, 1996, 2010
Wrestling	**13**	0	0	1	14	**1923**, **1938**, **1940**, **1942**, **1956**, **1963**, **1964**, **1967**, **1968**, **1969**, **1970**, **1973**, **1975**, **1976**, 2008
Total	126	6	26	78	238	

Bold indicates major championships: MSA conference championships or MPSSAA state championships.

=== Historic Varsity Sports ===
Sport	MSA Championships	MPSSAA State	MPSSAA Regional	MPSSAA District	Total	Championship Seasons
Boys' Bowling	**7**	0	0	0	7	**1938**, **1944**, **1945**, **1946**, **1948**, **1949**, **1954**
Boys' Fencing	**11**	0	0	0	11	**1930**, **1932**, **1936**, **1938**, **1940**, **1947**, **1949**, **1951**, **1954**, **1955**, **1956**
Boys' Golf	**10**	0	0	0	10	**1935**, **1940**, **1941**, **1942**, **1944**, **1954**, **1955**, **1956**, **1957**, **1960**
Boys' Ice Hockey	**2**	0	0	0	2	**1903**, **1941**
Boys' Tennis	**14**	0	0	0	14	**1923**, **1925**, **1926**, **1927**, **1929**, **1933**, **1935**, **1944**, **1946**, **1954**, **1958**, **1959**, **1961**, **1988**
Total	44	0	0	0	44	

Bold indicates MSA conference champions.

== Athletic Facilities ==
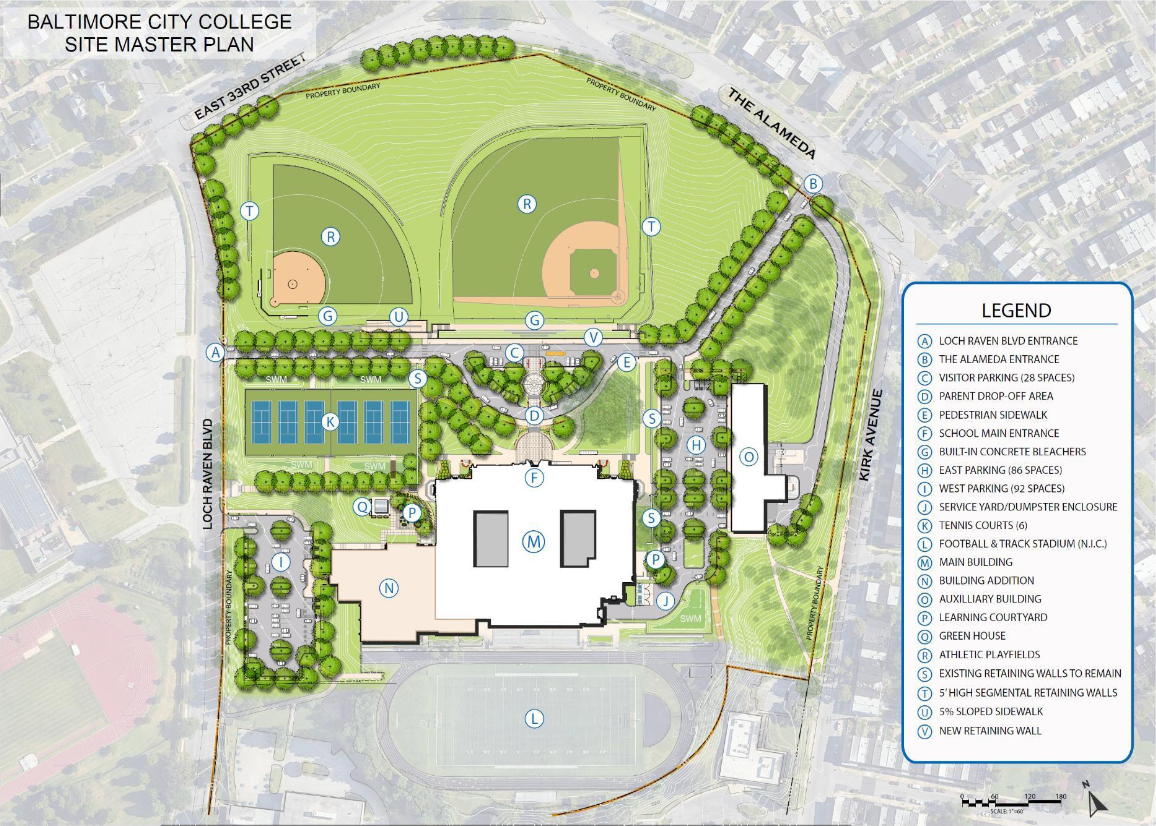
Baltimore City College campus master plan following the 2025-28 renovation.

The City College athletics infrastructure is anchored by the B.C.C. Athletic Center, a multi-venue sports and physical education complex located on the school’s historic Collegian Hill campus. A comprehensive renovation and expansion of the facility is scheduled to begin in Summer 2025, part of a district-wide modernization effort led by Baltimore City Public Schools.

=== B.C.C. Athletic Center ===
The B.C.C. Athletic Center is undergoing a major renovation project beginning in summer 2025. The 45,265 SF (4,204.2 m²) facility integrates athletic, academic, and community uses, and includes the following key components:

- Main Competition Gymnasium – A 11,869 sq ft (1,102.7 m^{2}) modern basketball facility with two-sided telescopic bleacher seating, a digital scoreboard, and integrated audiovisual systems.
- Auxiliary Gymnasium – Adjacent to the natatorium, this secondary gym supports practices, wrestling, volleyball, and general physical education activities.
- Natatorium – A dedicated aquatic facility accessible from the center, supporting both athletic training and instructional swim programming.
- Black Box Theater – A flexible performance and co-curricular space used by student arts groups and for community programming.
- Team Locker Rooms – Gender-specific suites for varsity and junior varsity teams, located along dedicated team corridors for improved access and privacy.
- Coaches’ Suite – Includes private offices, a training/rehab room, and a film review room for strategy and player development.
- Strength and Conditioning Center – Dedicated space outfitted with free weights, resistance machines, and space for functional athletic training.
- Central Lobby – A concessions and ticketing lobby with improved queuing, enhanced spectator access, and architectural circulation from the school’s main artery.
- Health Education Classrooms – Academic spaces located in the Castle’s east corridor and directly linked to the athletic center to support curriculum integration.

Additional upgrades include ADA-compliant access, enhanced security systems, expanded physical education capacity, and modernized HVAC and mechanical systems.

=== George Petrides Stadium at Alumni Field ===
George Petrides Stadium at Alumni Field serves as the primary outdoor athletic venue at Baltimore City College. Named for longtime athletic director and head football coach George Petrides, the stadium is used for football, soccer, lacrosse, and track and field competitions, as well as school-wide events and year-round training.

The stadium features a six-lane, all-weather track and a full-size synthetic turf field striped for multiple sports. The main grandstand, located on the north sideline, measures approximately 153 feet (46.6 m) wide by 29 feet (8.8 m) deep and seats an estimated 1,400–1,500 spectators. It offers elevated sightlines and a view of downtown Baltimore. A central operations booth used for scoreboard control and announcements is integrated into the seating deck.

A smaller visitor seating area is located on the south side of the stadium. The field is fully enclosed and includes on-site storage infrastructure, with additional exterior storage and utility upgrades planned as part of the 2025 renovation.

=== Other Fields and Venues ===
In addition to George Petrides Stadium at Alumni Field, the campus includes several specialized outdoor facilities:

- BCC Baseball Field
- BCC Softball Field
- BCC Tennis Courts

These facilities support both varsity sports and year-round programming, and are included in broader site enhancements associated with the 2025 project.

The athletic facilities at City College are located within a connected precinct, with integrated pathways and ADA-compliant entries linking them to academic and arts facilities. The addition of a vehicular connector campus through way, part of the upcoming modernization, will streamline transportation logistics, emergency access, and public parking for after-school events. Spectators will benefit from clearer signage, lighting, and defined entry points across campus.

== Under Armour Relationship ==
=== Team Uniforms and Special Apparel ===
Baltimore-based sportswear brand Under Armour is the official outfitter for all City College varsity teams. In October 2024, Under Armour collaborated with Baltimore-based retailer DTLR (owned by JD Sports) to launch exclusive "Rivalry Packs" celebrating the historic City–Poly football rivalry. These packs featured themed apparel and footwear, including sweatshirts, t-shirts, and custom-colored UA Gemini sneakers. The merchandise was made available at DTLR locations and Under Armour's Brand House in Harbor East.

=== Support for Student-Athletes ===
In July 2024, Under Armour, in partnership with Baltimore City Public Schools and MedStar Health, hosted a uniform unveiling event aimed at supporting student-athletes. The event provided free physicals, sports bra fittings, and back-to-school resources.

=== 2020 Television Commercial ===
Under Armour's "The Only Way Is Through" campaign, featuring athletes like Michael Phelps and Stephen Curry, included appearances by the B.C.C. boys' basketball team, showcasing the school's athletic brand on a national platform.

== Fight Song ==
City maintains a musical tradition that includes a spirited fight song performed regularly by the B.C.C. Marching Band during athletic events.

City Forever City Forever is the official fight song of the Baltimore City College Knights.

City forever,

We’ll praise her to the skies.
We’ll fight for old City
Until we do or die.
Rah! Rah! Rah!
Dear alma mater
Loyal we’ll always be.
City forever
And for victory.
