= Baltimore City College boys' basketball =

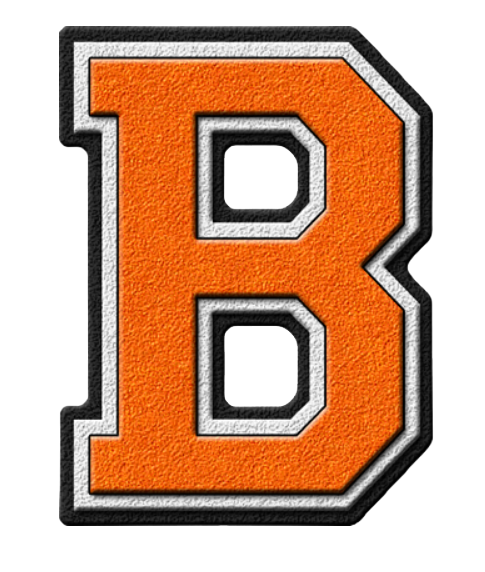
- Nickname: Knights
- Conference: District 9 [Baltimore City]
- Division: MPSSAA 3A [East]
- League: Independent [1896-1918] MSA [1919-1992] MPSSAA [1993-present]
- Arena: B.C.C. Athletic Center (opening 2028)
- Capacity: 824
- Location: Baltimore, MD, US
- Team colors: Orange and Black
- Head coach: Omarr Smith (9th season) Record: 158-35 (.818)
- Championships: (13) MSA Championships; 1922, 1923, 1934, 1935, 1938, 1939, 1940, 1961, 1963, 1966, 1967, 1969, 1970 (5) State Championships; 2009, 2010, 2014, 2023, 2025
- Conference titles: (10) State Final Fours; 1997, 1998, 1999, 2009, 2010, 2014, 2022, 2023, 2025, 2026
- Division titles: (3) City Championships; 2014, 2023, 2026
- Website: bccathletics.com
Home	Away

The City College Knights boys' basketball program is a high school basketball of the Baltimore City College. The program was established on January 3, 1896 when the school's general athletics committee voted to form its first varsity basketball team. One of the earliest recorded games in program history was a one-point overtime road loss to the Maryland Terrapins in 1913.

From 1919 to 1992, the team competed in the Maryland Scholastic Association (MSA), the Baltimore metropolitan area's public-private high school sports league, winning 13 conference championships (1922, 1923, 1934, 1935, 1938, 1939, 1940, 1961, 1963, 1966, 1967, 1969, and 1970). After 75 years of membership, the BCPS voted to withdraw its schools from the MSA, and accepted an invitation to join the MPSSAA to compete for state championships against public schools.

Since joining the MPSSAA in 1993, the Knights have won five MPSSAA state championships (2009, 2010, 2014, 2023, 2025) and have advanced to the state Final Four 10 times (1997, 1998, 1999, 2009, 2010, 2014, 2022, 2023, 2025, 2026). The program has won three Baltimore City championships (2014, 2023, 2026) and finished as district runner-up three times (2011, 2024, 2025).

== History ==
=== Program Origins and Early Years (1896–1912) ===
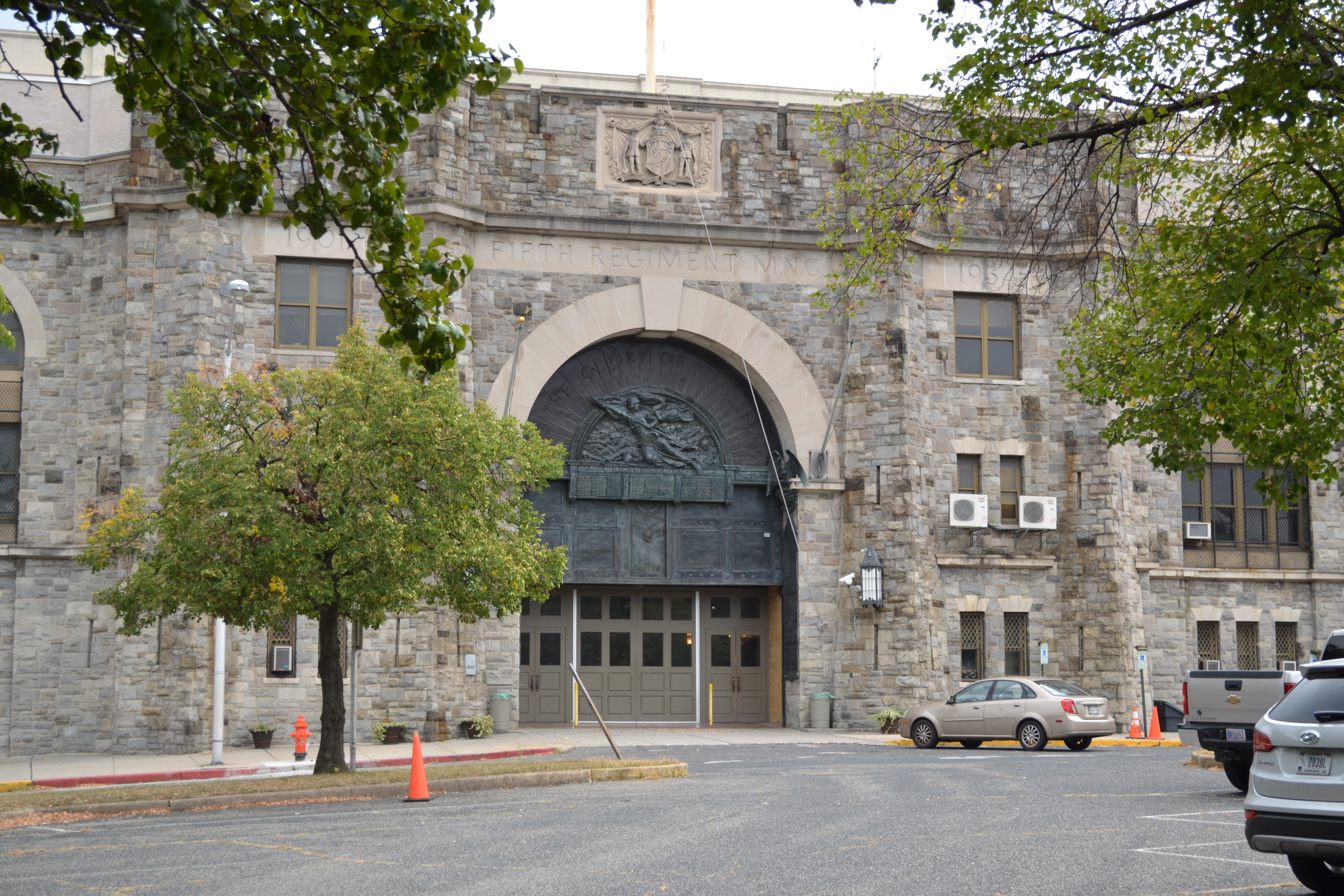
Fifth Regiment Armory hosted early City College basketball because the school lacked a gymnasium.

In January 1896, the school formed its first basketball team, making City College one of the earliest secondary schools in Maryland to sponsor the sport. Initially, the program competed in informal matches against club teams, college teams, and preparatory schools that existed at that time in Maryland, Pennsylvania, and Washington, DC, as no formal interscholastic league existed in Maryland at the time.

Early games were held at off-campus locations, including the Lyric Opera House and Fifth Regiment Armory, due to the school’s lack of a gymnasium. The team was sometimes referred to as the “City Five” in local press, a reference to its five-man starting lineup.

By the early 1900s, the basketball team had become a prominent feature of student life, regularly covered in The Collegian, the school newspaper. In 1905, under team captain Charles T. Crane, City completed an undefeated season against local interscholastic opponents and claimed an unofficial city championship.

Although no state-level basketball association existed before World War I, City College's consistent interscholastic competition helped lay the groundwork for the creation of the Maryland Scholastic Association in 1919, of which the school would become a founding member.

=== Maryland Scholastic Association era (1919-1992) ===
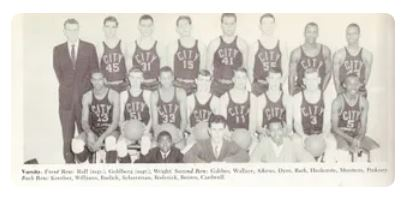
The 1963 MSA Conference championship team pose for a photo with then-head coach Jerry Phipps.

In 1919, B.C.C. president Dr. Phillip H. Edwards helped establish the MSA, with City College joining as a founding member. The program captured 12 conference championships as MSA members (1922, 1923, 1934, 1935, 1938, 1939, 1940, 1961, 1963, 1966, 1967, 1969).

Between 1960 and 1968, George Howard “Jerry” Phipps led the school through one of the most successful eras in program history. As head coach, Phipps earned a record of 133-27 (.831), five MSA championships (1961, 1963, 1965, 1966, 1967), and a 40-game consecutive win streak between 1966 and 1967. The 1967 team posted its second of back-to-back perfect seasons and was led to the MSA tournament championship by team captain and eventual BPD commissioner Leonard Hamm, .

Eugene Parker became the first Black faculty member in school history in 1954. Parker replaced Phipps as head coach in 1969 and guided the team to the MSA conference championship in his first season at the helm. He also won a MSA co-championship in 1970. After 73 years of membership, the school withdrew from the MSA to join the MPSSAA in 1993.

=== Maryland Public Secondary Schools Athletic Association era (1993–present) ===
City College boys' basketball has won five MPSSAA state championships (2009, 2010, 2014, 2023, 2025). The Knights have reached the MPSSAA state tournament semifinals 10 times (1997, 1998, 1999, 2009, 2010, 2014, 2022, 2023, 2025, 2026), third most all-time among Baltimore schools.

Wayne Cook, who had led the program since 1989, remained head coach during City’s early MPSSAA years. Under Cook, the Knights posted back-to-back 10–10 seasons in 1993–94 and 1994–95, followed by a 10–12 campaign in 1995–96. He was succeeded by Daryl Wade, who was hired for the 1996–97 campaign.

Wade quickly revitalized the program, guiding City to its first-ever MPSSAA state semifinal in 1997 and repeat appearances in 1998 and 1999. The team finished 15–10 in 1996–97, 16–12 in 1997–98, and 9–13 in 1999–2000 before Wade stepped down.

In 2005, former Towson Catholic coach Mike Daniel was hired. He led City to a 15–8 season in his first year, and two straight 20-win seasons (20–5 in 2007 and 20–4 in 2008). In 2009, Daniel guided City to its first MPSSAA title. The 2009–10 team went 24–3 and finished No. 1 in the final Baltimore Sun poll. Daniel was named All-Metro Coach of the Year. He stepped down after the 2010–11 season.

Daryl Wade returned in 2011. In 2014, he led the Knights to a 27–0 season, the 3A state title, and a No. 18 national ranking by USA Today and Student Sports.

In 2017, Omarr Smith, Sr. was named head coach. During his tenure, Smith has guided the Knights to two MPSSAA state championships (2023, 2025) and four state final four appearances (2022, 2023, 2025, 2026). In 2023, his City College team posted an undefeated record of 28–0, won the city championship, and earned the MPSSAA 3A state championship. At the conclusion of the season, Smith was named Metro Coach of the Year by the Baltimore Sun and Baltimore Banner.

== Program Overview ==
City College basketball has long been recognized as one of the premier high school programs in Maryland. Four teams in school history (1966, 1967, 2014, 2023) have completed undefeated seasons. City is the only public high school in Baltimore to win two or more MPSSAA state championships with undefeated records.

MPSSAA State Tournament
State Runner-up	1 (1998)
State Final Fours	10 (1997, 1998, 1999, 2009, 2010, 2014, 2022, 2023, 2025, 2026)
State Elite Eights	11 (1997, 1998, 1999, 2009, 2010, 2013, 2014, 2022, 2023, 2025, 2026)
Regional Finals (Sweet 16)	18 (1997, 1998, 1999, 2007, 2008, 2009, 2010, 2011, 2012, 2013, 2014, 2015, 2016, 2020, 2022, 2023, 2025, 2026)
Coach and Scholar-Athlete Accolades
All-Metro Coaches of the Year	3 (2010, 2014, 2023)
First Team All-Metro Players	15 (2007, 2008, 2009, 2010, 2011, 2014, 2020, 2023, 2024, 2025, 2026)
National† and Metro‡ Boys Basketball Poll Rankings (since 2000)
Highest Preseason National Ranking	No. 21 (2010)
Highest Final National Ranking	No. 18 (2014)
Highest Preseason Metro Ranking	No. 4 (2014)
Highest Final Metro Ranking	No. 1 (2010, 2014)
Notable Accomplishments
Undefeated Seasons	4 (1966, 1967, 2014, 2023)
20+ Win Seasons	14 (1966, 1967, 2006, 2007, 2008, 2009, 2012, 2013, 2014, 2020, 2022, 2023, 2025, 2026)
Longest Winning Streak (all-time)	40 games (Started: December 1966 - Ended: December 1968)
Longest Winning Streak (since 1993)	30 games (Started: December 2013 - Ended: December 2014)

† Ranking from the USA Today Super 25 National Boys Basketball Poll
‡ Ranking from The Baltimore Sun Top-15 Metro Boys Basketball Poll

== Recent season-by-season results ==
							Final Rankings		
Season	Wins	Loses	Pct.	MPSSAA Districts	MPSSAA Regional Tournament	MPSSAA State Tournament	Metro‡	State#	National†
2005-06	15	8	0.652	--	Regional Quarterfinals	--	NR	96	NR
2006-07	20	5	0.800	--	Regional Quarterfinals	--	12	42	NR
2007-08	20	4	0.833	--	Regional Semifinals	--	10	25	NR
2008-09	21	6	0.778	--	REGIONAL CHAMPIONS!	MPSSAA STATE CHAMPIONS!	6	7	NR
2009-10	24	3	0.906	--	REGIONAL CHAMPIONS!	MPSSAA STATE CHAMPIONS!	1	6	NR
2010-11	16	9	0.641	District Runner-up	Regional Semifinals	--	6	23	NR
2011-12	21	6	0.778	--	Regional Semifinals	--	9	31	NR
2012-13	20	6	0.769	--	Regional Semifinals	--	8	19	NR
2013-14	27	0	1.000	DISTRICT CHAMPIONS!	REGIONAL CHAMPIONS!	MPSSAA STATE CHAMPIONS!	1	4	18
2014-15	17	7	0.708	--	Regional Semifinals	--	RV	36	NR
2015-16	12	5	0.706	--	Regional Quarterfinals	--	NR	59	NR
2016-17	8	11	0.421	--	Regional Semifinals	--	NR	149	NR
2017-18	15	5	0.750	--	Regional Quarterfinals	--	13	31	NR
2018-19	13	9	0.591	--	Regional Quarterfinals	--	14	79	NR
2019-20	22	3	0.882	--	Regional Finals	--	3	25	NR
2020-21	0	0	0.000	Season Cancelled - Covid-19			N/A	N/A	N/A
2021-22	20	3	0.869	--	REGIONAL CHAMPIONS!	MPSSAA State Semifinals	9	26	NR
2022-23	28	0	1.000	DISTRICT CHAMPIONS!	REGIONAL CHAMPIONS!	MPSSAA STATE CHAMPIONS!	2	14	NR
2023-24	16	7	0.695	District Runner-up	Regional Quarterfinals	--	13	43	NR
2024-25	22	5	0.815	District Runner-up	REGIONAL CHAMPIONS!	MPSSAA STATE CHAMPIONS!	5	12	NR
2025-26	22	3	0.880	DISTRICT CHAMPIONS!	REGIONAL CHAMPIONS!	MPSSAA State Semifinals	9	18	NR
Total	379	105	0.785						

RV = Receiving votes | NR = Not ranked
† Ranking from USA Today Super 25 national boys basketball poll
‡ Ranking from Baltimore Sun Top-15 metro boys basketball poll
# Ranking from MaxPreps state boys basketball poll

== Athletic & Training Facilities ==
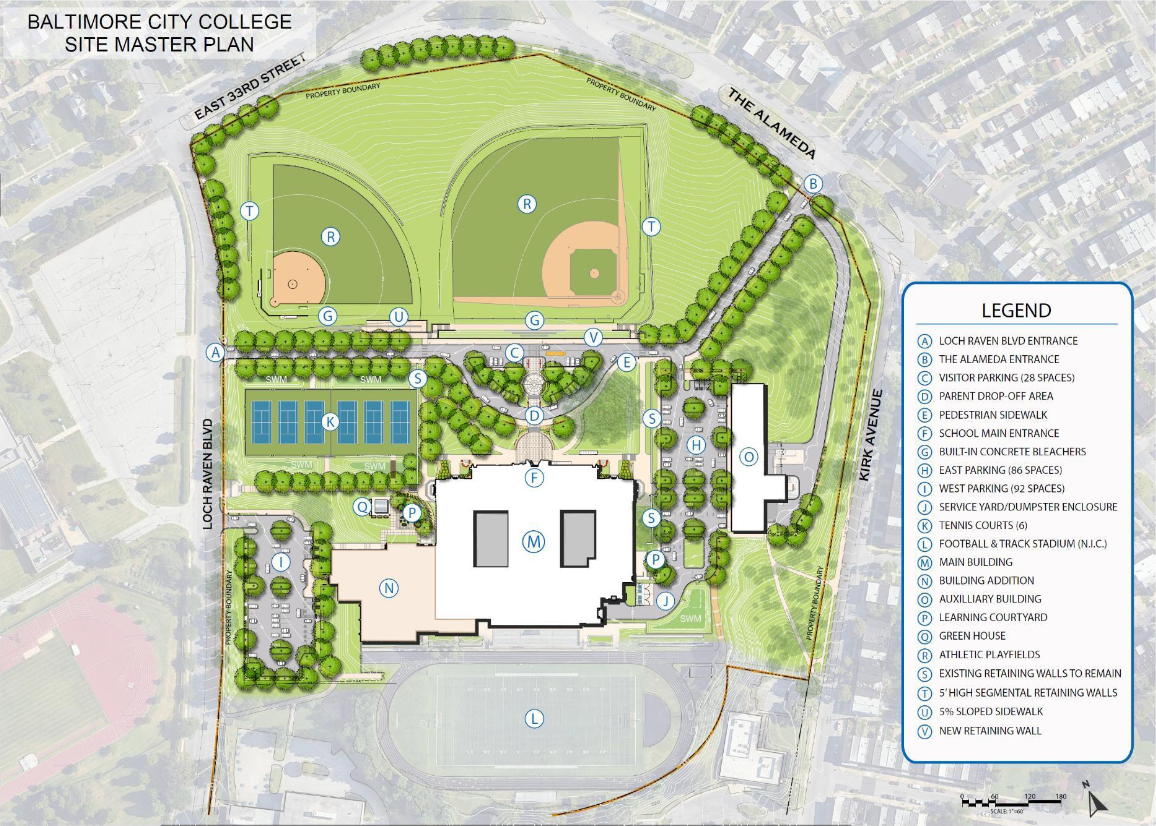
Baltimore City College campus master plan following the 2025-28 renovation.

In May 2025, Baltimore City Public Schools announced a comprehensive renovation of B.C.C's historic Collegian Hill campus. As part of this multi-year project, the school will temporarily relocate to the University of Baltimore from 2025 to 2028. During this period, all athletic teams will compete and train off-site.

The renovation includes a full modernization and expansion of the school’s athletic and wellness complex. The new 45,265 sq ft (4,205.3 m^{2}) facility, scheduled for completion ahead of the 2028–29 academic year, is designed to support both the boys’ and girls’ basketball programs and will feature:

- A renovated main competition gymnasium with integrated A/V and seating for up to 824 spectators
- A new auxiliary gym with up to 146 seats for physical education, volleyball, wrestling, training, and small events
- New team locker rooms, training and recovery rooms, coaches' offices, and a film room
- Dedicated entrances and circulation for athletes and fans, including enhanced security features
- Shared access to the Black Box Theater and a natatorium wing

The expanded center is part of a broader campus renewal effort and reflects a district-wide investment in equity, safety, and student experience.

== Notable alumni ==
=== Professional Sports ===
The City College basketball program has multiple alumni who have gone on to play professional sports in the National Basketball Association or the National Football League.

City College Basketball Alumni in the NBA or NFL
Name	Class	Position	Teams	Years active
Charles Tapper	2012	F	Dallas Cowboys	2014
Will Barton	2010*	SG	Portland Trail Blazers, Denver Nuggets, Washington Wizards, Toronto Raptors	2012–2023
C.J. Fair	2008*	PF	Indiana Pacers (waived prior to regular season)	2014
Bryant Johnson	1998	F	Arizona Cardinals, San Francisco 49ers, Detroit Lions, Houston Texans	2003-2011
Lee Dedmon	1966	F	Los Angeles Lakers	1971-1972

(*) transferred to a national basketball academy.

=== NCAA Division I ===
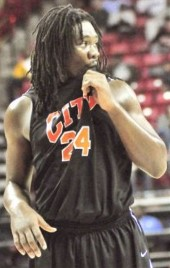
Former City College forward Charles Tapper, former Oklahoma Sooners and the Dallas Cowboys defensive end.

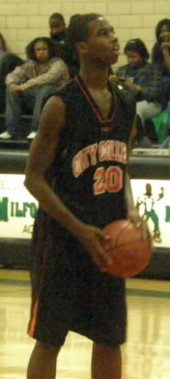
Former City College forward C. J. Fair prepares for a free throw during a game in 2008. Fair later became an All-Atlantic Coast Conference and All-American player for the Syracuse Orange.

Several former B.C.C. student-athletes have continued their playing careers in the NCAA, NAIA, and NJCAA. Many of these alumni went on to have successful careers playing NCAA Division I basketball, including:

- Nick Faust, a member of two state championship teams, was named to the 2012 Atlantic Coast Conference All-Freshman team at Maryland.
- Former small forward C.J. Fair, who helped lead City College to a 25–4 record and the regional semifinals as a sophomore, was named 2013 ACC Preseason Player of the Year at Syracuse.
- Former basketball standout Will Barton, played professional basketball for 13 years, including 11 seasons in the National Basketball Association, for teams like the Washington Wizards, Toronto Raptors, and Portland Trail Blazers. Barton was a shooting guard at City College before ultimately finishing his high school basketball career at Brewster Academy in New Hampshire. Barton was the Conference USA men's basketball Player of the Year in 2011. Barton was selected by the Portland Trail Blazers in the 2012 NBA draft.

Other alumni who became NCAA Division I athletes include:

- Omarr Smith, Jr. SG, 2025 New Mexico State Aggies
- Kyree Smith, SG, 2023 Loyola Greyhounds
- Tim Bond, G, 2014 Eastern Michigan Eagles
- Kamau Stokes, PG, 2014 Kansas State Wildcats
- Dwayne Morgan, SF, 2013 UNLV Running Rebels
- Charles Tapper, F, 2011 Oklahoma Sooners football
- Nick Faust, SG, 2011 Maryland Terrapins
- Mike Cheatham, SG, 2011 Marshall Thundering Herd
- Will Barton, SG, 2010 Memphis Tigers
- Aron Nwankwo, F, 2010 Pittsburgh Panthers
- Therm James, G, 2009 Mount St. Mary's (MD)
- Jordan Latham, PF, 2009 Xavier Musketeers
- C.J. Fair, SF, 2008 Syracuse Orange
- Todd Galloway, SG, 2003 Florida State Seminoles
- Jermaul Akanbi, F, 2002 Maryland Eastern Shore Hawks
- Bryant Johnson, F 1999 Penn State Nittany Lions football

=== Baltimore Sun First-Team All-Metro ===
Selected by the Baltimore Sun.

- Camari Stewart, Forward (2026)
- Omarr Smith, Jr., Guard (2024, 2025)
- Cam Horton, Guard (2023)
- Cam Horton, Guard (2022)
- Kyree Smith, Guard (2022)
- Dominick Carrington, Guard (2020)
- Tim Bond, Guard (2014)
- Omari George, Guard (2014)
- Kamau Stokes, Guard (2014)
- Nick Faust, Guard (2011)
- Jordan Latham, Center (2010)
- Adam Johnson, Forward (2009)
- C.J. Fair, Forward (2008)
- Devin Brown, Guard (2007)

== Undefeated seasons ==
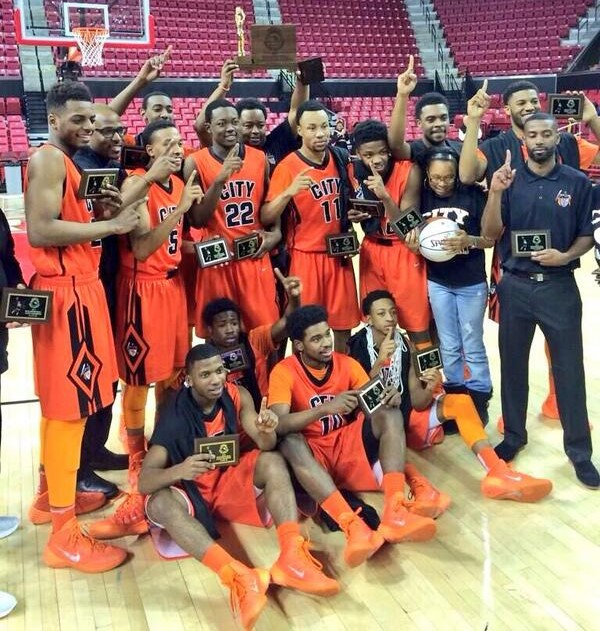
The boys basketball team and coaching staff pose for a picture after winning the MPSSAA 3A state championship in 2014, the Knights' third state title in six seasons.

=== 2022-23: Most wins in school history (28-0) ===
With its second undefeated season in nine years and fourth overall, the 2022-23 Knights posted a 28-0 record en route to the 2023 Baltimore City League championship, 2023 MPSSAA 3A North Region championship, and 2023 MPSSAA 3A state championship. The team's 28 victories are the most in program history, besting its previous record of 27 wins set during the 2013-14 season. City became the first Baltimore City League school to complete two undefeated seasons since the city school joined the MPSSAA in 1993. Head coach Omarr Smith led the Knights to its second consecutive 3A state semifinal appearance and finished the season as the No. 2-ranked team in the Baltimore Sun final boys basketball poll behind nationally-ranked Mount Saint Joseph High School. Cam Horton was named to the Baltimore Sun All-Metro first team for the second consecutive year. Coach Smith was named Baltimore Sun co-Coach of the Year.

=== 2013-14: First undefeated season in 47 years (27-0) ===
With a record of 22–0, the City won the 2014 Baltimore City League championship and posted the school's first undefeated regular season since 1967. The Knights entered the MPSSAA 3A state basketball tournament as the top-seeded team in the East region. On March 15, 2014, the Knights defeated Westlake in the MPSSAA finals to win the 3A state championship, finishing the season 27–0. The Knights set a then-single season school record with 27 wins. In so doing, City College completed its third perfect season in school history and became the first Baltimore City League team since the 2008–2009 season to post an undefeated record. City finished the season as the No. 1-ranked team in the Baltimore Sun boys basketball poll for the second time in four years. The Knights finished ranked No. 18 nationally in the final USA Today Super 25 and Student Sports Fab 50 boys basketball polls, the second highest ranking of any team in Maryland, Pennsylvania, Virginia, and Washington, D.C.

=== 1966-67: Back-to-back undefeated seasons and MSA Championships (20-0) ===
In 1967, City completed its second of two consecutive undefeated seasons under Coach Jerry Phipps. The Knights finished the season ranked No. 1 in the final Baltimore Sun boys basketball poll and won the second of back-to-back MSA championships. Leonard Hamm, who later became commissioner of the Baltimore Police Department, was team captain.

=== 1965-66: First undefeated season in program history (20-0) ===
The top-ranked Knights finished the season with a record of 20-0 and beat perennial power Dunbar High School twice during the 1965–66 season. City was coached by Jerry Phipps and led by Lee Dedmon, who became an All-Atlantic Coast Conference center at North Carolina.

== Recognition and Rankings ==
City College is regarded as one of the most historically significant high school basketball programs in Baltimore. In 2023, the independent sports platform Baltimore Sports and Life published its list of the Top 100 Baltimore City Public School Basketball Teams of All Time, ranking the most dominant public high school teams in the city’s basketball history.

=== City College Teams Ranked in the Top 100 ===
Six B.C.C. teams were featured in the final rankings, highlighting more than five decades of excellence:

- No. 9 – 2022–23 (28–0): Completed the first 28-win season in school history, winning the city championship and the MPSSAA Class 3A state championship. Coached by Omarr Smith.
- No. 23 – 2013–14 (27–0): Posted a perfect season and finished No. 18 nationally in the final USA Today rankings. Coached by Daryl Wade.
- No. 45 – 1966–67 (20–0): Captured the MSA championship and completed back-to-back undefeated seasons under Coach Jerry Phipps.
- No. 57 – 2009–10 (24–3): Won the MPSSAA Class 2A state title and finished No. 1 in the final Baltimore Sun metro rankings.
- No. 66 – 1997–98 (22–3): Advanced to the MPSSAA state finals for the first time in school history. Led by Coach Daryl Wade.
- No. 89 – 1965–66 (20–0): First undefeated team in program history; defeated Dunbar twice and won the MSA title. Coached by Jerry Phipps.

These rankings placed City College among a select group of elite programs, including Dunbar, Lake Clifton, and Edmondson, that had multiple teams honored. City is one of just two schools with two undefeated teams ranked among the top 25.

City's 13 MSA championships, five MPSSAA state titles, four undefeated seasons, and nine state semifinal appearances affirms its legacy as a cornerstone of Baltimore’s high school basketball tradition.

== Videos ==
- 2023 City vs Aberdeen, MPSSAA 3A Semifinals – YouTube
- 2025 City vs Sherwood, MPSSAA 3A Championship – YouTube
