= City–Poly football rivalry =

American football rivalry

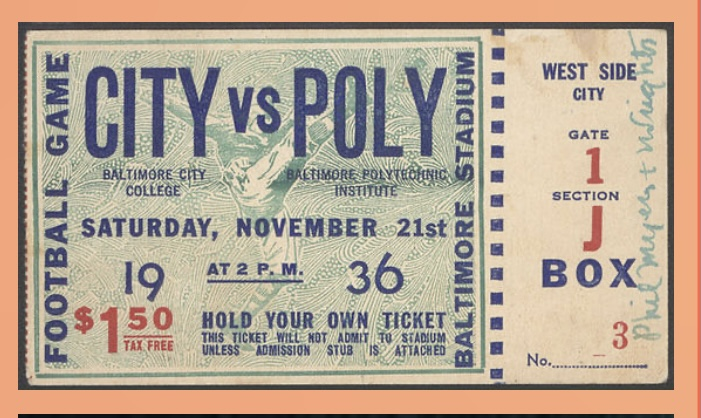
A game ticket to the 1936 matchup between Baltimore City College and Baltimore Polytechnic Institute.

The City-Poly football rivalry, also referred to as the "City-Poly Game" is an American football rivalry between the Baltimore City College Black Knights (City) and the Baltimore Polytechnic Institute Engineers (Poly). This matchup is the oldest football rivalry in Maryland and one of the oldest in the United States. The rivalry began in 1889 and the teams have met 136 times in history. City College leads the series 68–63–6.

From the first game in the series until 1922, the game was played at various parks in Baltimore, Maryland, United States. Starting in 1923, the game was played on Saturday after Thanksgiving Day in football stadiums, starting with Baltimore Municipal Stadium. The game was moved to Thanksgiving Day in 1944 due to a scheduling conflict with the Army–Navy Game, which was also played at Municipal Stadium that year. The game remained on Thanksgiving Day for nearly five decades until 1992 when City College and Polytechnic withdrew from the Maryland Scholastic Association (MSA) to join the Maryland Public Secondary School Athletic Association (MPSSAA. Today, the game is continues to be played at a neutral site and currently takes place at Hughes Stadium on the campus of Morgan State University. In November 1941, 30,000 spectators attended the City-Poly game, which continues to hold the record of the largest attendance in the series.

== History ==
=== A budding rivalry (1889 through 1909) ===
The first Poly-City game took place in 1889 when a junior varsity football team from Polytechnic met the varsity football team from City College at Clifton Park in the northeast section of Baltimore, Maryland, United States. The inaugural game was won by City College. Then known as the Collegians, City College continued to beat rival Poly each year through 1901. In 1902, for the first time in the then-12-year-old rivalry, no game was played. The series resumed in 1903, with City beating Poly each year until 1906. In 1907, the two teams experienced the first tie or draw in the series occurred. Poly beat City for the first time ever in 1908.

=== Baltimore's premiere high school rivalry (1910s through 1940s) ===
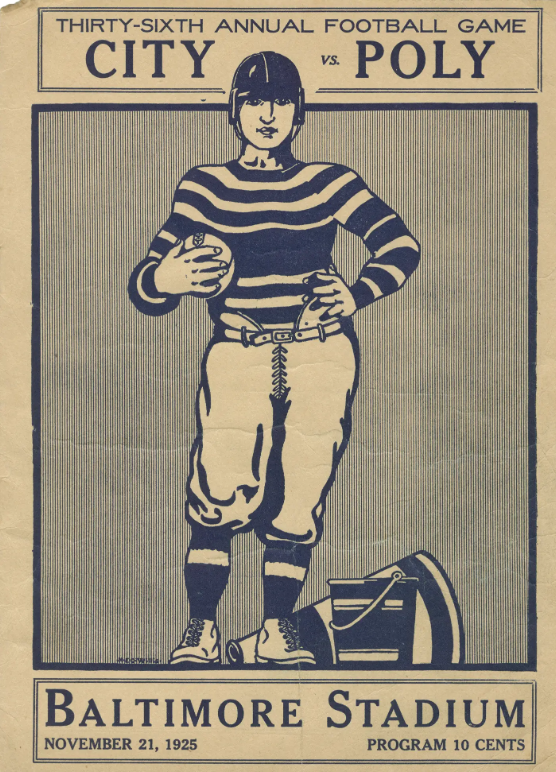
Cover of a 1925 game program from a matchup between Baltimore City College and Baltimore Polytechnic Institute

During the 1910s, Polytechnic improved its football program significantly and was the dominant team in the series. Between 1910 and 1919, Poly won every game in the series, except the 1912 game when they were bested by City. During this decade, Poly shut out City in 1914, 1915, 1916, and 1917. Polytechnic's winning streak over City College continued through 1921. In 1922, City College beat Polytechnic by a score of 27–0 to end a nine-game losing streak against the Engineers.

By the 1920s, the Poly-City rivalry the dominant and most heated high school football rivalry in the Baltimore region. One of the most controversial games in the series took place during the 1920s. The eligibility of a City College player was challenged prior to the 1926 matchup. The Maryland Scholastic Association formed a committee to investigate the matter. Following an investigation and a physical altercation involving the player's father, the committee ruled that the player was banned from participating on the team and expelled was expelled from Baltimore City Public Schools. Following the ruling, the two teams met at the Baltimore Stadium with 20,000 spectators on hand. Polytechnic won the game by a score of 3–0 with a late field goal in the fourth quarter. The 1920s concluded with Polytechnic dominated a 20-year stretch in the annual series with City College.

The City College football program was resurgent in the 1930s. Polytechnic dominated the series in the previous two decades, however the Engineers only won two of the 10 games against Collegians between 1930 and 1939. In 1934, Harry Lawrence, a Polytechnic graduate and former player, was hired as head football coach at City College. Lawrence coached the City College Collegians to several dominate wins over Polytechnic Engineers through the 1930s and into the early-1940s. In November 1941, 30,000 spectators attended the Poly-City game, which continues to hold the record of the largest attendance in the series. In 1944, the annual series, which had been played on the Saturday following Thanksgiving Day, was moved to Thanksgiving Day afternoon due to a scheduling conflict with the Army–Navy Game. The game remained on Thanksgiving Day for nearly 50 years.

=== National prominence: The Lumsden and Young era (1950s and 1960s) ===
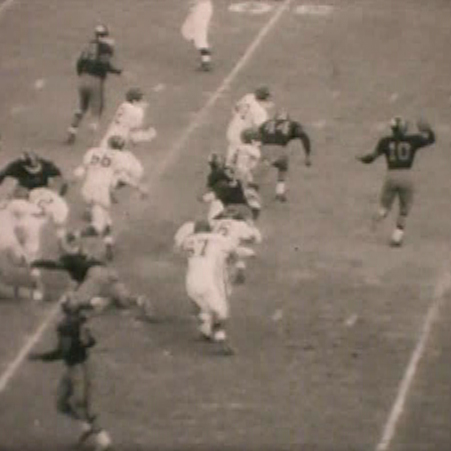
Future Baltimore mayor, Kurt Schmoke (#10), throws a pass at the 1965 City-Poly game

From 1950 to 1959, Polytechnic, led by legendary former head football coach and athletic director Bob Lumsden, won nine out of the 10 games of the decade, including five straight wins. In his career at Poly, Lumsden earned a win-loss record of 11–7 record against City, when he retired as Poly's head coach in 1966. In 1962, Lumsden coached Poly to an undefeated record of 9-0 and earned a trip to the unofficial high school national championship game at the Orange Bowl in Miami, Florida against the top-ranked Miami Senior High School. The tide turned in the 1960s when George Young was hired as City's head football coach. During his time at City College, Young coached the Collegians to six wins over their rival Engineers and also won six MSA championships. Young also created a nationally ranked program in City College with the Collegians finishing the 1968 season ranked No. 8 in the National Sports News Service (NSNS) prep football poll.

=== Poly dominates the series (1970s and 1980s) ===
During the 1970s and 1980s, Polytechnic controlled the series with their rival City College. During this period, City College's student population dropped significantly due to a 4 year renovation project at the school. At times, City could only field a junior varsity team and lost 17 straight games in the series, before winning in 1987. This is the longest winning streak in the series for either team. In 1993, the Baltimore City public schools withdrew from the Maryland Scholastic Athletic association and joined the Maryland Public Secondary Schools Athletic Association (MPSSAA). This change meant that the football season would end earlier forcing Poly and City to move their game from Thanksgiving Day to the first Saturday in November.

=== City dominates the series (1990s through present) ===
Since 1990, City College holds a win-loss record of 23-14 versus Polytechnic with no game played in 2020 due to covid. From 1990 to 1999, the game was played at Baltimore Memorial Stadium. In 1999, the two rivals played their last-ever game at Memorial Stadium. The game was moved to M&T Bank Stadium due to the NFL's Baltimore Ravens opening a new downtown stadium. From 1990 to 1999, the two teams spilt their annual series during this period, winning five games each. The next decade also featured a spilt series, with each team winning five games in the 10 seasons from 2000 to 2009. City won 13 straight games from 2012 to 2024, which is the second-longest winning streak in the series all-time. In 2017, history was made when the first-ever female player took the field in this series.

All games in the series between 1990 and 1996 were played at Baltimore Memorial Stadium, a multi-purpose stadium that was home to the Baltimore Colts and the Baltimore Ravens of the NFL and Major League Baseball's Baltimore Orioles. When the Ravens moved to M&T Bank Stadium in downtown Baltimore, the game moved to that location. The last City-Poly game at M&T Bank was played in 2017. The game is now played at Hughes Stadium on the campus of Morgan State University.

== Cultural significance ==
The Poly-City game has been ubiquitous in households across Metropolitan Baltimore since the series began in 1889. Along with the Turkey Bowl played between Loyola Blakefield and Calvert Hall College High School, the Poly-City game is the most high-profile high school football rivalry in the Baltimore area. Some households root strictly for one side of the rivalry, however it is not unusual for homes to spilt allegiance between both schools.

As it has for the last 134 years, the Poly-City continues to maintain cultural significance in Baltimore. Today, the game is considered each school's homecoming game and attracts thousands of students, alumni, and affiliated supporters to a week-long series of local events, culminating in CityPoly Fest, a festival which attracts sponsors and thousands of participants each year.

== Game results ==
Since 1889, the Black Knights and the Engineers have played 136 times. City College leads the series 68–63–6. Since 1923, the game has been played in football stadiums. That year, the teams met at the Baltimore Municipal Stadium, which later becomes the Baltimore Memorial Stadium. The two rivals met at this location until 1992, when both schools withdrew from the Maryland Scholastic Association to join the Maryland Public Secondary Schools Athletic Association to compete for state championships with Maryland's other public schools.

City victories	Poly victories	Tie games

No.	Date	City		Poly		Notes
12	1889-1900					City won the first 12 games of the series
13	1901	City	5	Poly	0	
14	1903	City	10	Poly	0	No game was played in 1902
15	1904	City	6	Poly	0	
16	1905	City	6	Poly	4	
17	1906	City	5	Poly	0	
18	1907	City	2	Poly	2	
19	1908	City	0	Poly	11	Poly win
20	1909	City	0	Poly	11	
21	1910	City	3	Poly	0	
22	1911	City	0	Poly	6	
23	1912	City	13	Poly	6	
24	1913	City	10	Poly	20	
25	1914	City	0	Poly	3	
26	1915	City	0	Poly	13	
27	1916	City	0	Poly	13	City's only loss of the season
28	1917	City	0	Poly	26	
29	1918	City	3	Poly	13	
30	1919	City	7	Poly	19	
31	1920	City	2	Poly	14	
32	1921	City	0	Poly	27	
33	1922	City	27	Poly	0	
34	1923	City	14	Poly	6	
35	1924	City	13	Poly	6	City retired the Evening Sun Poly-City trophy
36	1925	City	12	Poly	0	
37	1926	City	0	Poly	3	future City coach kicks winning field goal for Poly
38	1927	City	11	Poly	18	
39	1928	City	6	Poly	33	
40	1929	City	0	Poly	7	first year with numerals on both sides of game jersey(City)
41	1930	City	0	Poly	18	
42	1931	City	7	Poly	7	
43	1932	City	0	Poly	0	
44	1933	City	6	Poly	12	
45	1934	City	13	Poly	0	
46	1935	City	26	Poly	0	
47	1936	City	20	Poly	6	
48	1937	City	6	Poly	6	
49	1938	City	33	Poly	0	
50	1939	City	12	Poly	0	
51	1940	City	19	Poly	0	
52	1941	City	18	Poly	0	
53	1942	City	19	Poly	7	
54	1943	City	12	Poly	19	
55	1944	City	7	Poly	7	
56	1945	City	6	Poly	7	
57	1946	City	6	Poly	0	
58	1947	City	7	Poly	6	23,000 in attendance
59	1948	City	13	Poly	12	
60	1949	City	26	Poly	6	
61	1950	City	0	Poly	12	Lumsden was assistant coach
62	1951	City	7	Poly	18	
63	1952	City	0	Poly	21	
64	1953	City	0	Poly	6	20,000 in attendance
65	1954	City	0	Poly	19	
66	1955	City	12	Poly	12	17,242 in attendance
67	1956	City	6	Poly	12	
68	1957	City	0	Poly	30	
69	1958	City	6	Poly	12	
70	1959	City	0	Poly	12	
71	1960	City	30	Poly	26	City's first win in 11 years
72	1961	City	30	Poly	8	
73	1962	City	6	Poly	14	
74	1963	City	0	Poly	28	
75	1964	City	14	Poly	6	
76	1965	City	52	Poly	6	Schmoke City's quarterback, 22,676 in attendance
77	1966	City	42	Poly	6	Anderson was team captain
78	1967	City	20	Poly	16	City headcoach George Young coaches his last high school game.
79	1968	City	26	Poly	6	
80	1969	City	12	Poly	6	
81	1970	City	0	Poly	6	
82	1971	City	14	Poly	22	
83	1972	City	6	Poly	32	
84	1973	City	0	Poly	29	
85	1974	City	0	Poly	6	
86	1975	City	6	Poly	20	
87	1976	City	0	Poly	34	
88	1977	City	0	Poly	7	
89	1978	City	6	Poly	30	only 5,000 in attendance
90	1979	City	7	Poly	31	no City varsity game played by JVs
91	1980	City	0	Poly	47	no City varsity game played by JVs
92	1981	City	0	Poly	32	
93	1982	City	12	Poly	30	
94	1983	City	0	Poly	18	
95	1984	City	0	Poly	48	
96	1985	City	0	Poly	33	
97	1986	City	21	Poly	41	
98	1987	City	34	Poly	22	City's Chris Smith throws 100 yd TD pass, first win in last 17 years
99	1988	City	20	Poly	7	
100	1989	City	8	Poly	36	100th anniversary of rivalry, Mayor Schmoke throws out first ball
101	1990	City	0	Poly	27	
102	1991	City	14	Poly	8	
103	1992	City	20	Poly	0	last game played on Thanksgiving
104	1993	City	20	Poly	21	
105	1994	City	6	Poly	7	
106	1995	City	14	Poly	31	
107	1996	City	26	Poly	20	
108	1997	City	7	Poly	0	
109	1998	City	12	Poly	13	
110	1999	City	20	Poly	38	
111	2000	City	18	Poly	6	
112	2001	City	2	Poly	0	Poly was forced to forfeit game (ineligible player)
113	2002	City	6	Poly	7	
114	2003	City	21	Poly	41	
115	2004	City	6	Poly	24	
116	2005	City	15	Poly	12	game played at Ravens Stadium
117	2006	City	44	Poly	8	game played at Ravens Stadium
118	2007	City	26	Poly	20	game played at Ravens Stadium
119	2008	City	13	Poly	16	City led 13-0 at halftime
120	2009	City	20	Poly	26	City misses extra point in regulation, Poly wins in overtime.
121	2010	City	6	Poly	14	game was tied 6-6 at halftime
122	2011	City	16	Poly	22	
123	2012	City	20	Poly	14	
124	2013	City	36	Poly	14	
125	2014	City	22	Poly	12	both teams entered the game with losing records
126	2015	City	42	Poly	6	
127	2016	City	30	Poly	28	the game was tied at 16 at the end of regulation
128	2017	City	22	Poly	18	last game at M&T Bank Stadium
129	2018	City	32	Poly	14	game played at Hughes Stadium (Morgan State)
130	2019	City	10	Poly	6	City played without 10 suspended players
131	2021	City	20	Poly	18	Poly missed game winning field goal as time expired(no 2020 game due to covid)
132	2021	City	24	Poly	12	teams met for a MPSSAA playoff game
133	2022	City	24	Poly	16	a fight at the game resulted in both teams being banned from the playoffs
134	2023	City	44	Poly	6	City led 30-0 at halftime
135	2024	City	40	Poly	0	City led 16-0 at halftime
136	2025	City	32	Poly	36	Poly ends City's 13 game win streak, highest ever combined score
137	2026	City	20	Poly	0	City led 12-0 at halftime
Series: City leads 68–63–6

== Sources ==
- Leonhart, James Chancellor (1939). One Hundred Years of the Baltimore City College. H.G. Roebuck & Son. OCLC 610526848.
