= George Petrides =

George Petrides with his sculpture Refugee – Woman of Smyrna in Athens, Greece

George Petrides (Greek: Γιώργος Πετρίδης; born 1964) is a Greek American sculptor living and working in Athens and New York City. His work primarily consists of large-scale figurative sculptures in bronze, mixed media, and recycled plastic.

== Early life and education ==
Petrides was born in Athens, Greece and spent his youth between Greece and the United States. He earned a Bachelor of Arts in classics from Harvard University in 1985 and dual master's degrees (an MBA and an MA in economics) from Stanford University in 1993.

Prior to pursuing art full-time in 2017, Petrides worked as a managing director in investment banking at Donaldson, Lufkin & Jenrette. While working in banking, he studied art part-time at various institutions, including the Art Students League of New York, the Académie de la Grande Chaumière in Paris, and the New York Studio School. He completed the school's certificate program in 2022.

== Artistic practice ==
Petrides's work integrates traditional hand-sculpting with modern digital fabrication methods. His creative process typically begins by hand-modeling clay using live models or archival photographs. The initial forms are then high-resolution 3D-scanned into digital software, scaled up through 3D printing or CNC milling, and reworked manually with power tools.

While some works are cast in bronze using traditional lost-wax casting, he frequently employs mixed media, integrating epoxy clay, milk glazes, ground metals, acrylic paints, and repurposed plastics into finished surfaces. Art critics have highlighted his surface treatment, noting that his works purposefully retain visible finger marks and tool cuts to explore human experience and structural transition, rather than formal naturalism.

== Notable works and exhibitions ==
=== Hellenic Heads ===
Petrides is best known for Hellenic Heads, a traveling exhibition of six oversized busts, exploring key historical periods of Greek history. Each bust is about a specific era: Classical Greece, the Byzantine period, the Greek War of Independence, the 1922 Burning of Smyrna, the 1940s Axis occupation, and the modern era. Each is modeled on someone close to the artist.

The exhibition premiered in May 2022 at the Greek embassy in Washington, D.C., and has since toured multiple cities including the National Hellenic Museum in Chicago and in Venice during the 60th Venice Biennale in 2024.

=== Public and institutional commissions ===
Petrides has completed public installations and private commissions. Notable works include:

- Refugee – Woman of Smyrna (2022), a bronze-finished sculpture installed in Neo Psychiko, Athens, commissioned to mark the centennial of the 1922 Asia Minor Catastrophe.
- Head of Thalia II, a bronze figure in custom patina installed at the Tiffany & Co. Fifth Avenue landmark store in New York City.
- Aretaieia (2024), a public bronze-finished sculpture installed on the grounds of the Aretaieion University Hospital in Athens.

== Publications ==
- Hellenic Heads: George Petrides – Venice Edition (2025). ISBN 979-8-9925033-0-2
- Hellenic Heads: George Petrides – USA Edition (2024)
- Figure and Form: George Petrides and Nassos Daphnis (2023)
