= C. J. Fair =

American basketball player (born 1991)

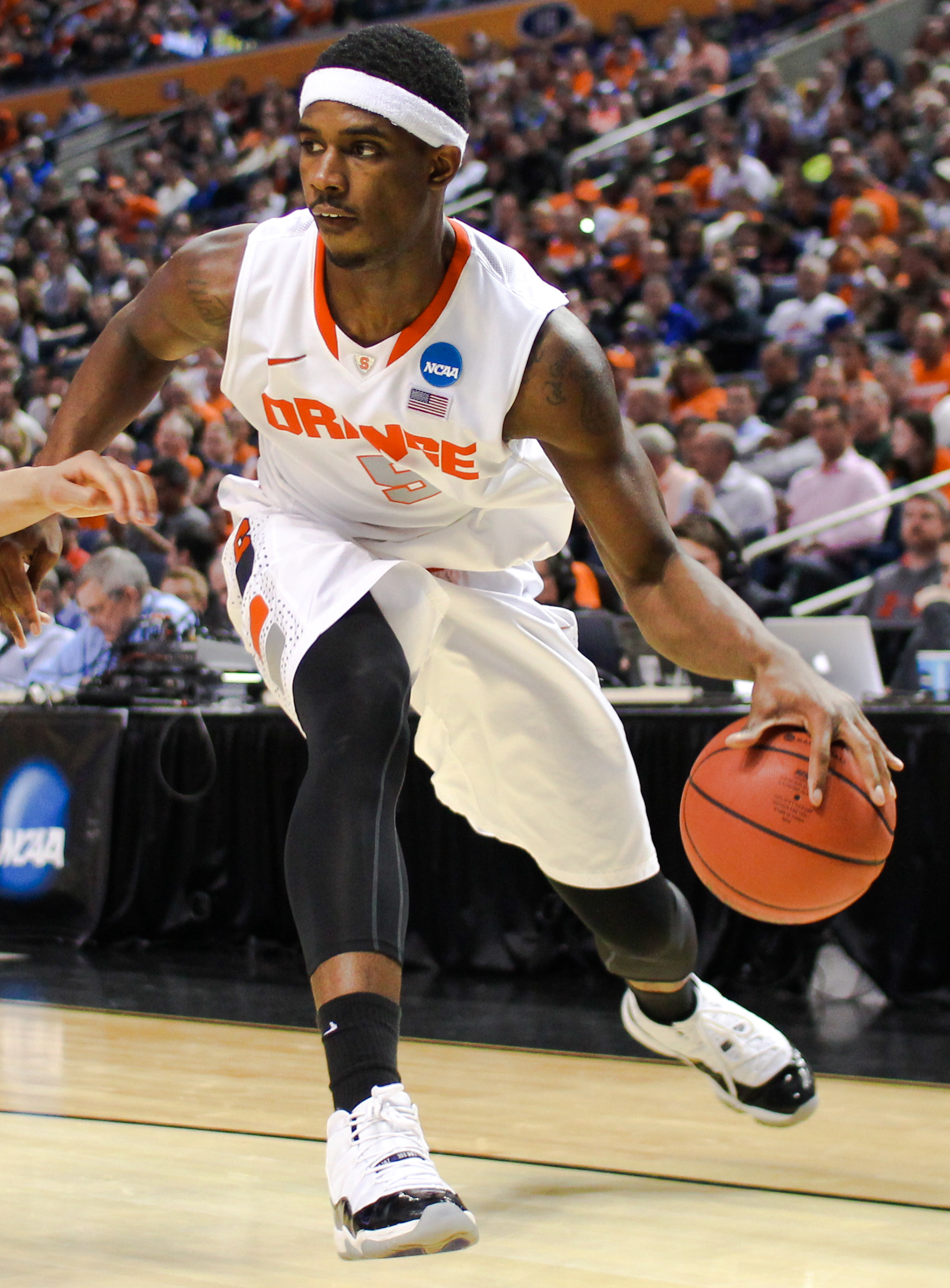
- Fair playing for Syracuse at the 2014 NCAA tournament

Al-Nasr
- Position: Power forward
- League: UAE National Basketball League

Personal information
- Born: September 13, 1991 (age 35) Baltimore, Maryland, U.S.
- Listed height: 6 ft 8 in (2.03 m)
- Listed weight: 218 lb (99 kg)

Career information
- High school: Baltimore City College (Baltimore, Maryland); Brewster Academy (Wolfeboro, New Hampshire)
- College: Syracuse (2010–2014)
- NBA draft: 2014: undrafted
- Playing career: 2014–present

Career history
- 2014–2016: Fort Wayne Mad Ants
- 2016–2017: Limoges CSP
- 2017–2018: Fort Wayne Mad Ants
- 2018–2019: Windy City Bulls
- 2019–present: Al-Nasr Dubai

Career highlights
- NBA D-League All-Rookie Second Team (2015); Consensus second-team All-American (2014); First-team All-ACC (2014); Second-team All-Big East (2013)
- Stats at Basketball Reference

Carl Keith "C. J." Fair Jr. (born September 13, 1991) is an American professional basketball player for the Al-Nasr Dubai of the UAE National Basketball League. He played college basketball for the Syracuse Orange.

== High school career ==
Fair is from Baltimore, Maryland and spent his freshman to junior years of high school at Baltimore City College, a public college preparatory school. The Knights were 18–6 in his freshman season. Fair, a Baltimore Sun First-Team All-Metro selection, helped lead City College to a 25–4 record and a berth in the state regional semifinals as a sophomore. He missed his junior season in high school due to a knee injury, and later committed to Syracuse University in October 2008.

Fair enrolled at Brewster Academy in New Hampshire for his senior year. In his one season there, Brewster won the New England Preparatory School Athletic Council (NEPSAC) title and went 35–5, winning their last 13 games of the season. Fair's season high point total was 32 against South Kent.

== College career ==
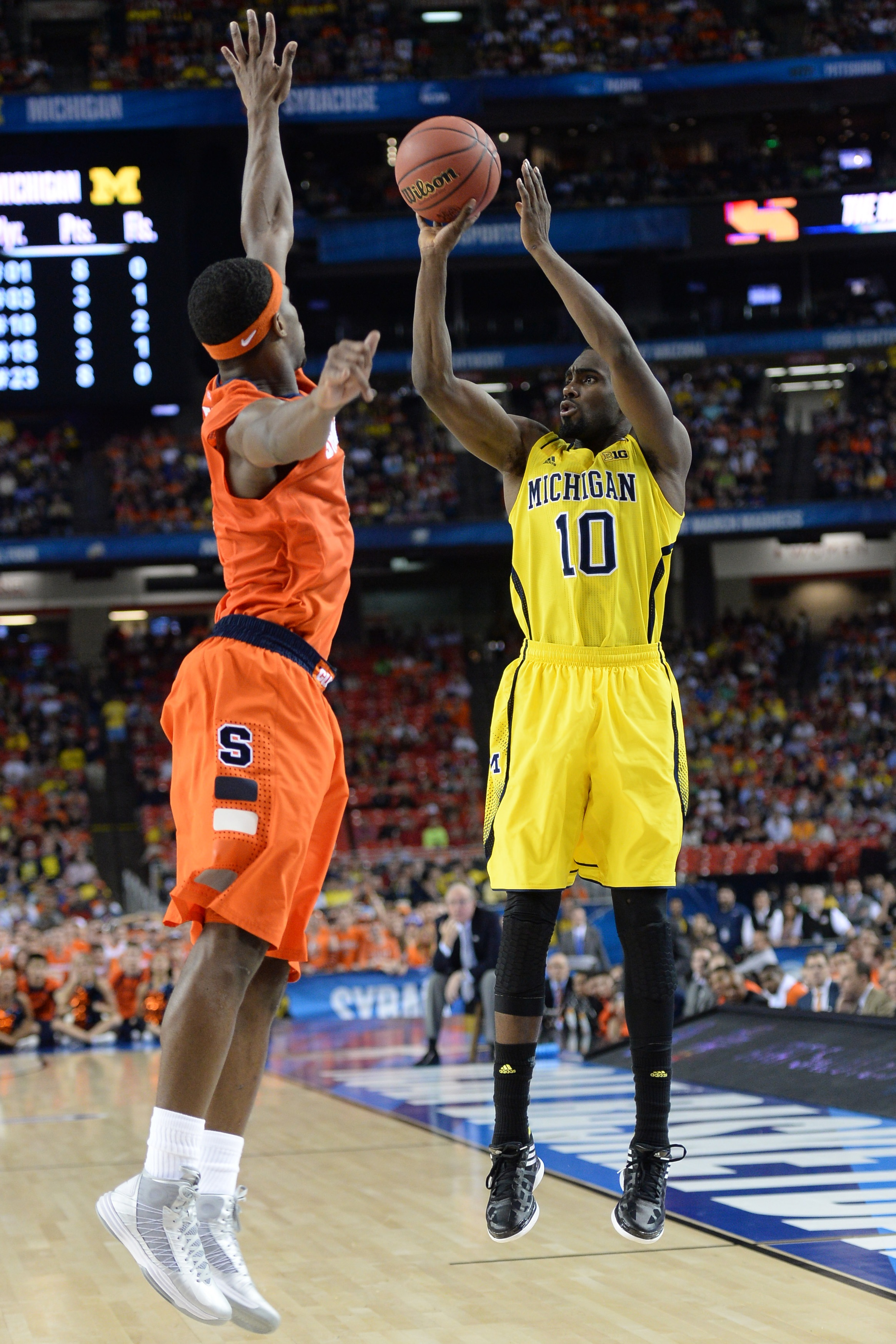
Fair defending against Tim Hardaway Jr. in the 2013 NCAA Men's Division I Basketball Tournament final four.

In his four-year career at Syracuse, Fair played 143 games, averaging 11.6 points, 5.7 rebounds and 1.1 steals per game, as he was named to the All-Big East second team in 2013 and to the All-Acc first team in 2014. He was also named to the NABC Division I All-District 2 first team (2014), USBWA NCAA All-American second team (2014), NABC Division I All-District 5 second team (2013) and USBWA All-District II first team (2013).

On February 13, 2014, he was named one of the 30 finalists for the Naismith College Player of the Year.

=== College statistics ===
Year	Team	GP	GS	MPG	FG%	3P%	FT%	RPG	APG	SPG	BPG	PPG
2010–11	Syracuse	32		18.6	.543	.333	.609	3.8	.4	.8	.8	6.4
2011–12	Syracuse	37		26.4	.464	.250	.743	5.4	.9	1.1	.5	8.5
2012–13	Syracuse	40		34.9	.470	.469	.755	6.9	.7	1.1	1.1	14.5
2013–14	Syracuse	34		37.8	.429	.276	.725	6.4	1.3	1.3	.8	16.5

== Professional career ==
=== Fort Wayne Mad Ants (2014–2016) ===
==== 2014–2015 season ====
After going undrafted in the 2014 NBA draft, Fair joined the Dallas Mavericks for the 2014 NBA Summer League. On September 5, 2014, he signed with the Indiana Pacers. However, he was later waived by the Pacers on October 25 after appearing in two preseason games. Five days later, he was acquired by the Fort Wayne Mad Ants of the NBA Development League as an affiliate player of the Pacers. In 56 games for the Mad Ants in 2014–15, he averaged 14.8 points, 5.9 rebounds and 1.2 steals per game.

==== 2015–2016 season ====
After joining the Boston Celtics for the NBA Summer League, on September 15, 2015, Fair signed with the Indiana Pacers, returning to the team's training camp for the second year in a row. However, he again failed to make the final roster, as the Pacers waived him on October 24 after he appeared in five preseason games. Five days later, he was reacquired by the Fort Wayne Mad Ants.

=== Limoges Cercle Saint-Pierre (2016–2017) ===
On July 22, 2016, Fair signed with French club Limoges CSP.

=== Second Stint with Fort Wayne Mad Ants (2017–2018) ===
On November 2, 2017, Fair was included in the opening night roster of the Fort Wayne Mad Ants.

=== Windy City Bulls (2018–2019) ===
On February 12, 2018, Fair was traded by the Fort Wayne Mad Ants to the Windy City Bulls in exchange for Duje Dukan and the returning player rights to Henry Sims.

On March 25, 2018, the Chicago Bulls announced that they had signed Fair, but was waived on the next day without playing a game for the Bulls. Fair was signed by the Windy City Bulls to their training camp roster.

=== Al Naser Dubai (2019–present) ===
On August 30, 2019, it was reported that Al Naser had added Fair to their roster.

== The Basketball Tournament (TBT) ==
In the summer of 2017, Fair competed in The Basketball Tournament on ESPN for Boeheim's Army; a team composed of Syracuse University basketball alum. In five games, he averaged 8.6 points, 6.6 rebounds and 1.4 steals to help lead Boeheim's Army to the Semifinal Round where they fell 81–77 to the eventual champions Overseas Elite. Fair also played for Boeheim's Army in 2016. In three games, he averaged 9.3 points and 5.0 rebounds per game.
