= Will Barton =

American basketball player (born 1991)

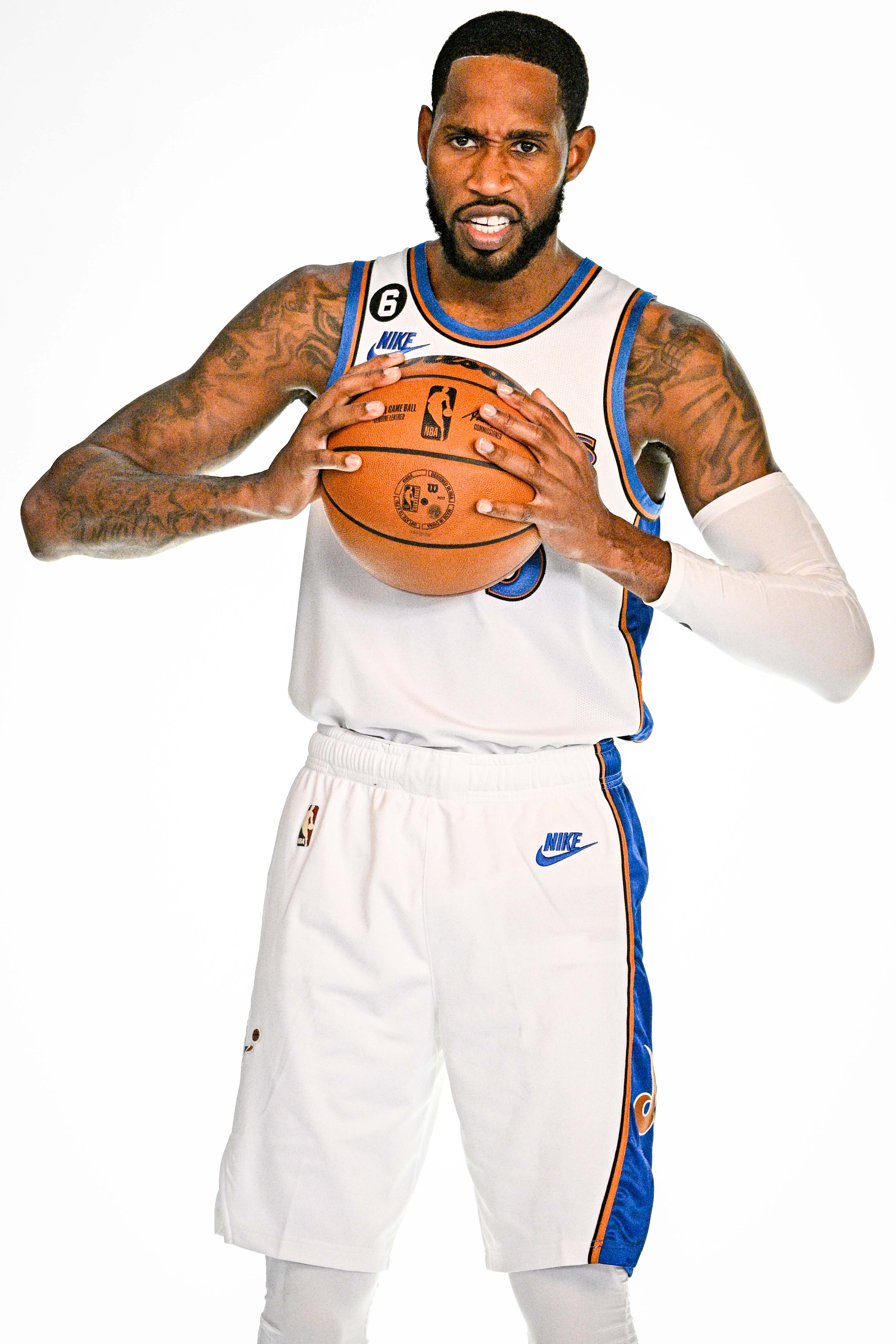
- Barton with the Washington Wizards in 2022

Minnesota Timberwolves
- Title: Player development associate
- League: NBA

Personal information
- Born: January 6, 1991 (age 35) Baltimore, Maryland, U.S.
- Listed height: 6 ft 5 in (1.96 m)
- Listed weight: 181 lb (82 kg)

Career information
- High school: Baltimore City College (Baltimore, Maryland); National Christian Academy (Fort Washington, Maryland); Lake Clifton Eastern (Baltimore, Maryland); Brewster Academy (Wolfeboro, New Hampshire)
- College: Memphis (2010–2012)
- NBA draft: 2012: 2nd round, 40th overall pick
- Drafted by: Portland Trail Blazers
- Playing career: 2012–2025
- Position: Shooting guard
- Number: 1, 5, 55

Career history

Playing
- 2012–2015: Portland Trail Blazers
- 2012–2013: →Idaho Stampede
- 2015–2022: Denver Nuggets
- 2022–2023: Washington Wizards
- 2023: Toronto Raptors
- 2024: Covirán Granada
- 2024: Cangrejeros de Santurce
- 2024: Guangdong Southern Tigers
- 2025: Atléticos de San Germán

Coaching
- 2025–2026: Iowa Wolves (assistant)
- 2026–present: Minnesota Timberwolves (assistant)

Career highlights
- Conference USA Player of the Year (2012); First-team All-C-USA (2012); Third-team All-C-USA (2011); C-USA All-Freshman Team (2011)
- Stats at NBA.com
- Stats at Basketball Reference

William Norman Barton III (born January 6, 1991) is an American former professional basketball player who currently serves as a player development associate for the Minnesota Timberwolves of the National Basketball Association (NBA). He played college basketball for Memphis Tigers, earning Conference USA Men's Basketball Player of the Year honors in 2012. He was selected 40th overall in the 2012 NBA draft by the Portland Trail Blazers and played for the Idaho Stampede of the NBA G League before being traded to the Denver Nuggets in 2015, where he eventually became their franchise leader in three-pointers made. He also played in the NBA for the Washington Wizards and Toronto Raptors.

== High school career ==
Barton, the No. 6-rated player in the nation in 2010, attended four schools in five years. He started his basketball career at Baltimore City College, a public college preparatory high school, for two years before reclassifying and transferring to National Christian Academy in Fort Washington, Maryland, to repeat his sophomore year. Barton then enrolled at Baltimore's Lake Clifton Eastern High School for his junior year. Then as a senior in 2009–10, he attended Brewster Academy. Barton was rated the best shooting guard by Scout.com and ESPN.com in 2010. Barton chose Memphis over Arizona, Maryland, Kentucky, Indiana, and Villanova.

Barton was invited to play in the Jordan Brand Classic in 2010.

College recruiting
| Name | Hometown | School | Height | Weight | Commit date |
|---|---|---|---|---|---|
| Will Barton; SG | Baltimore, Maryland | Brewster Academy | 6 ft 6 in (1.98 m) | 170 lb (77 kg) | Jun 6, 2009 |
| Will Barton; SG | Recruit ratings: Scout: Rivals: (97) | | | | |
Overall recruit ranking: Scout: 12 Rivals: 11 ESPN: 8
Note: In many cases, Scout, Rivals, 247Sports, On3, and ESPN may conflict in their listings of height and weight.; In these cases, the average was taken. ESPN grades are on a 100-point scale.; Sources: "Memphis Basketball Commitments". Rivals.; "2010 Memphis Basketball Commits". Scout.; "ESPN". ESPN.; "Scout.com Team Recruiting Rankings". Scout.; "2010 Team Ranking". Rivals.

== College career ==
He came to Memphis in 2010 and played every game in his freshman season, leading the Tigers in minutes per game at 30.6 and scoring with 12.3 points per game. Barton had a breakout sophomore season, leading the Tigers in points per game (18.0) and rebounds per game (8.0) en route to winning C-USA Player of the Year. For his career, he averaged 15.2 points, 6.5 rebounds and 2.9 assists in 32.9 minutes per game.

== Professional career ==
=== Portland Trail Blazers (2012–2015) ===
In March 2012, Barton decided to forgo his final two years of eligibility and declare for the 2012 NBA draft. He was selected by the Portland Trail Blazers with the 40th overall pick. On December 7, 2012, he was assigned to the Idaho Stampede of the NBA Development League. He was recalled on December 9, reassigned on January 6, and recalled again on January 9. He made his first NBA start on April 10, 2013, against the Los Angeles Lakers.

On February 26, 2014, Barton recorded a season-high 20 points and a career-high 11 rebounds in 124–80 win over the Brooklyn Nets. In a televised interview following the game, when asked by a reporter about a spontaneous "Will Barton" chant that had broken out late in the contest, the guard replied, "I like to think I'm the people's champ," thereby instantly giving birth to a new nickname and a Trail Blazers meme. He went on to record 17 points and six rebounds on May 12 to help Portland win Game 4 of their semi-final match-up against the San Antonio Spurs.

=== Denver Nuggets (2015–2022) ===
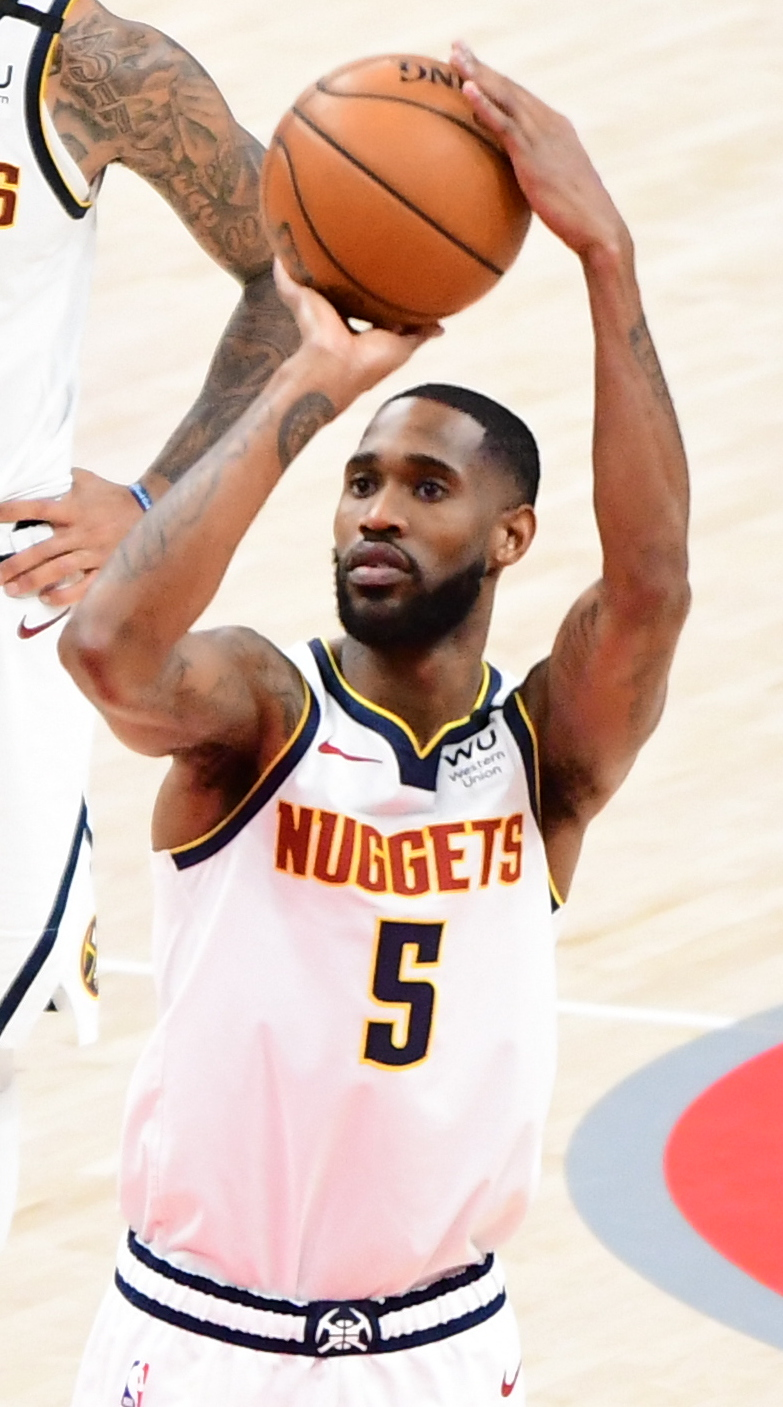
Barton with the Denver Nuggets in 2020

On February 19, 2015, Barton was traded, along with Víctor Claver, Thomas Robinson and a lottery-protected 2016 first-round pick, to the Denver Nuggets in exchange for Arron Afflalo and Alonzo Gee.

On August 7, 2015, Barton re-signed with the Nuggets. On November 13, 2015, he scored a career-high 26 points in a 107–98 win over the Houston Rockets. He topped that mark on December 20 with 32 points against the New Orleans Pelicans. Barton's strong pre-Christmas play earned him recognition as a possible contender for the 2015–16 Sixth Man of the Year award. Over the Nuggets' first 29 games of the season, Barton averaged 15.7 points, 6.1 rebounds, 2.3 assists and 1.1 steals in 29.0 minutes per game off the bench.

Barton appeared in just six of the Nuggets' first 18 games of the 2016–17 season. He played in the first three games before missing the next nine after spraining his left ankle. He then returned for three before missing another for personal reasons, and then a further two with another left ankle complaint. On January 17, 2017, he had season highs of 26 points and eight assists in a 127–121 win over the Los Angeles Lakers. On February 6, 2017, he scored a then season-high 31 points and hit five three-pointers in a 110–87 win over the Dallas Mavericks. On March 13, 2017, in a 129–101 win over the Los Angeles Lakers, Barton scored 22 points and went 3 of 4 behind the arc and 6 of 9 overall in his most productive outing since the All-Star break. Prior to the game against the Lakers, Barton had made just five of his previous 21 three-point tries. On March 16, 2017, he scored a career-high 35 points in a 129–114 win over the Los Angeles Clippers.

On November 11, 2017, Barton had season highs with 26 points and nine rebounds in a 125–107 win over the Orlando Magic. On November 30, 2017, Barton capped a career-high 37 points with a driving layup with 3.2 seconds left to lift the Nuggets to a 111–110 win over the Chicago Bulls. On February 3, 2018, he scored a team-high 25 points in a 115–108 win over the Golden State Warriors.

On July 9, 2018, Barton re-signed with the Nuggets. On October 20, 2018, in just the second game of the season, Barton injured his right hip on a reverse layup in the third quarter of Denver's 119–91 win over the Phoenix Suns. He was subsequently ruled out for five to six weeks after undergoing surgery on October 23. He missed longer than expected, returning to action on January 12, 2019, against the Suns after missing 38 games; in 16 minutes, he scored six points on 2-of-10 shooting. On February 28, he recorded 21 points and 13 rebounds in a 111–104 loss to the Utah Jazz.

On March 4, 2022, Barton made his 769th three-pointer with the Nuggets in a 116–101 victory over the Houston Rockets, surpassing J. R. Smith as the franchise's all-time leader in made three-pointers. On April 16, during Game 1 of the first round of the playoffs, Barton logged 24 points and five assists in a 123–107 loss to the Golden State Warriors.

=== Washington Wizards (2022–2023) ===
On July 6, 2022, Barton was traded, alongside Monté Morris, to his hometown team the Washington Wizards in exchange for Kentavious Caldwell-Pope and Ish Smith. Barton made his Wizards debut on October 19, recording 14 points, two rebounds and three assists in a 114–107 win over the Indiana Pacers. He averaged just under eight points per game before reaching a contract buyout agreement with the Wizards on February 21, 2023.

=== Toronto Raptors (2023) ===
On February 28, 2023, Barton signed with the Toronto Raptors.

On January 29, 2024, Barton signed with CSKA Moscow of the VTB United League, but on February 20, he left the team before playing for them.

=== Fundación CB Granada (2024) ===
On March 13, 2024, Barton signed with Covirán Granada of the Spanish ACB.

=== Cangrejeros de Santurce (2024) ===
On May 3, 2024, Barton signed with the Cangrejeros de Santurce of the Baloncesto Superior Nacional.

=== Guangdong Southern Tigers (2024) ===
On September 6, 2024, Barton signed with the Guangdong Southern Tigers of the Chinese Basketball Association. On November 5, his contract was terminated.

=== Atléticos de San Germán (2025) ===
On February 19, 2025, Barton signed with the Atléticos de San Germán of the Baloncesto Superior Nacional (BSN) for the 2025 season.

On April 24, 2025, Barton announced his retirement from professional basketball.

== Coaching career ==
On October 8, 2025, Barton was hired to serve as an assistant coach for the Iowa Wolves of the NBA G League.

On September 25, 2026, the Minnesota Timberwolves promoted Barton to serve as a player development associate under head coach Chris Finch.

== Career statistics ==
Legend
| GP | Games played | GS | Games started | MPG | Minutes per game |
| FG% | Field goal percentage | 3P% | 3-point field goal percentage | FT% | Free throw percentage |
| RPG | Rebounds per game | APG | Assists per game | SPG | Steals per game |
| BPG | Blocks per game | PPG | Points per game | **Bold** | Career high |
| * | Led the league |

=== NBA ===
==== Regular season ====
| Year | Team | GP | GS | MPG | FG% | 3P% | FT% | RPG | APG | SPG | BPG | PPG |
|---|---|---|---|---|---|---|---|---|---|---|---|---|
| 2012–13 | Portland | 73 | 5 | 12.2 | .382 | .138 | .769 | 2.0 | .8 | .5 | .1 | 4.0 |
| 2013–14 | Portland | 41 | 0 | 9.4 | .417 | .303 | .813 | 1.8 | .8 | .2 | .2 | 4.0 |
| 2014–15 | Portland | 30 | 0 | 10.0 | .380 | .222 | .667 | 1.1 | .9 | .5 | .1 | 3.0 |
| 2014–15 | Denver | 28 | 0 | 24.4 | .443 | .284 | .810 | 4.6 | 1.9 | **1.2** | .5 | 11.0 |
| 2015–16 | Denver | **82*** | 1 | 28.7 | .432 | .345 | .806 | 5.8 | 2.5 | .9 | .5 | 14.4 |
| 2016–17 | Denver | 60 | 19 | 28.4 | .442 | .370 | .753 | 4.3 | 3.4 | .8 | .5 | 13.7 |
| 2017–18 | Denver | 81 | 40 | **33.1** | **.452** | .370 | .805 | 5.0 | **4.1** | 1.0 | **.6** | **15.7** |
| 2018–19 | Denver | 43 | 38 | 27.7 | .402 | .342 | .770 | 4.6 | 2.9 | .4 | .5 | 11.5 |
| 2019–20 | Denver | 58 | 58 | 33.0 | .450 | .375 | .767 | **6.3** | 3.7 | 1.1 | .5 | 15.1 |
| 2020–21 | Denver | 56 | 52 | 31.0 | .426 | **.381** | .785 | 4.0 | 3.2 | .9 | .4 | 12.7 |
| 2021–22 | Denver | 71 | **71** | 32.1 | .438 | .365 | .803 | 4.8 | 3.9 | .8 | .4 | 14.7 |
| 2022–23 | Washington | 40 | 0 | 19.6 | .387 | .380 | .778 | 2.8 | 2.4 | .4 | .3 | 7.7 |
| 2022–23 | Toronto | 16 | 2 | 13.2 | .354 | .333 | **1.000** | 1.6 | 1.1 | .7 | .2 | 4.5 |
| Career | | 679 | 286 | 25.2 | .430 | .355 | .787 | 4.1 | 2.7 | .7 | .4 | 11.2 |

==== Playoffs ====
| Year | Team | GP | GS | MPG | FG% | 3P% | FT% | RPG | APG | SPG | BPG | PPG |
|---|---|---|---|---|---|---|---|---|---|---|---|---|
| 2014 | Portland | 7 | 0 | 11.6 | **.500** | **.545** | .833 | 1.7 | .4 | .1 | .3 | 6.4 |
| 2019 | Denver | **14** | 3 | 23.4 | .348 | .273 | .692 | 4.8 | 1.7 | .3 | **.6** | 9.1 |
| 2021 | Denver | 3 | 1 | 27.7 | .442 | .333 | **1.000** | 4.3 | 2.7 | .7 | .3 | **16.3** |
| 2022 | Denver | 5 | **5** | **34.4** | .409 | .393 | .667 | **5.6** | **2.8** | **.8** | .2 | 13.8 |
| Career | | 29 | 9 | 22.9 | .396 | .339 | .738 | 4.1 | 1.7 | .4 | .4 | 10.0 |
