= Campus of Baltimore City College =

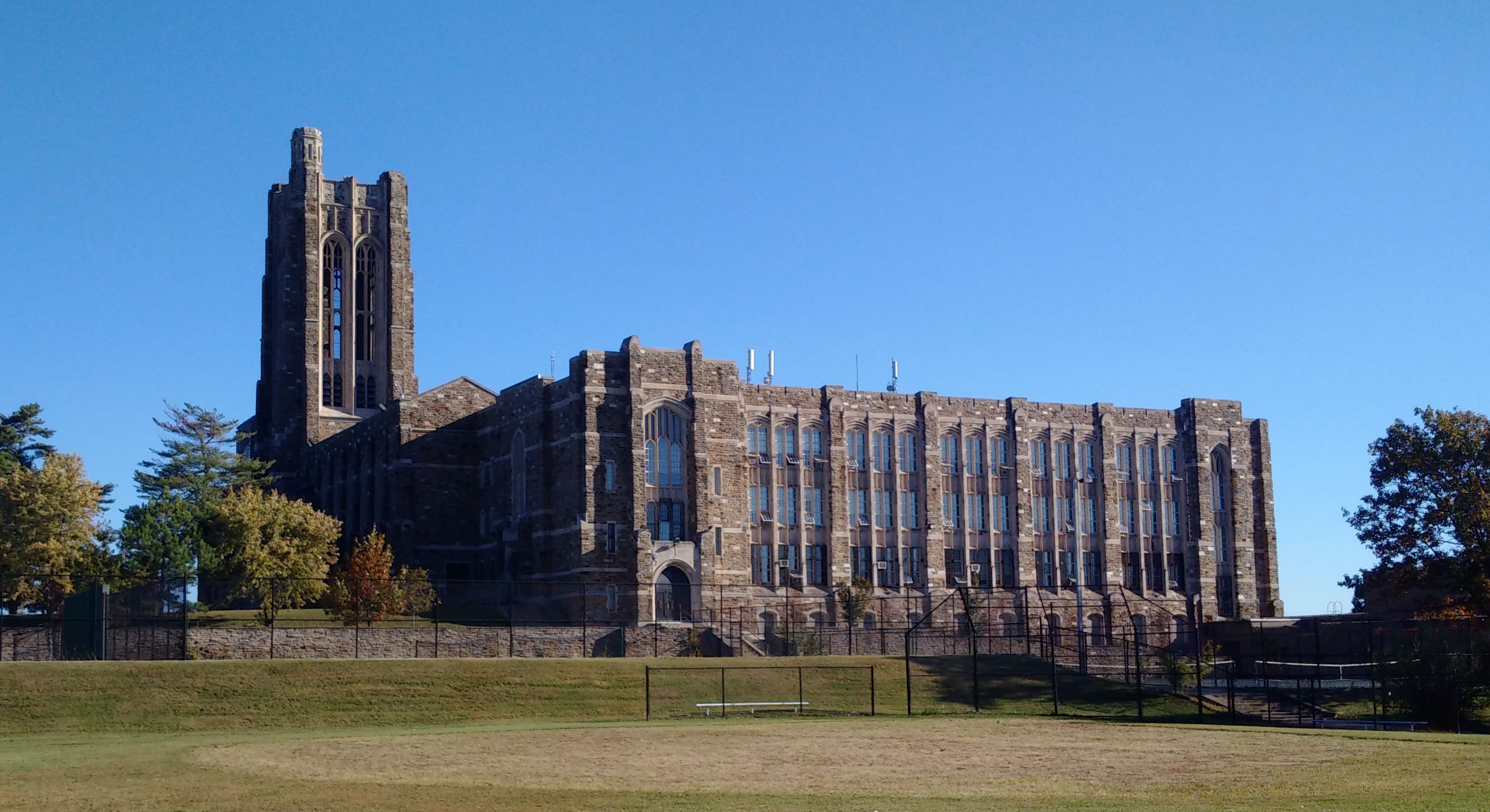
The Castle on the Hill viewed from Loch Raven Boulevard.

The campus of Baltimore City College, known colloquially as City, City College, and B.C.C., is Collegian Hill, a 38-acre hilltop site in northeast Baltimore, Maryland. Standing at approximately 265 feet (81 meters) above sea level, Collegian Hill is one of Baltimore's highest natural point within the city's historic core and urban grid. Anchored by the Castle on the Hill, a grand Collegiate Gothic academic building and notable local landmark. The campus serves as both a historic landmark and a modern teaching and learning environment.

Completed in 1928 and designed by Buckler and Fenhagen (known today as Ayers Saint Gross), the Castle is noted for its 150-foot central tower, slate roofing, limestone trim, and symbolic carvings. The campus was listed on the National Register of Historic Places in June 2003 and designated a Baltimore City Landmark in March 2007.

The school’s academic environment has been supported by multiple renovations, including a major gymnasium expansion in the 1970s, science lab upgrades in 2013, and a new library and learning commons in 2016. In 2025, the Baltimore City Public Schools launched a three-year, campus-wide modernization project that will restore historic features while adding advanced science, dining, athletic, arts, and collaborative learning facilities. The project is scheduled for completion in 2028.

== Location and surrounding community ==
The City College campus is located in the northeastern Baltimore neighborhood of Coldstream-Homestead-Montebello (CHM), a predominantly residential community known for its historical significance and civic associations. The neighborhood is bounded by 33rd Street to the south, The Alameda to the west, Loch Raven Boulevard to the east, and Erdman Avenue to the north. Baltimore City College is one of the neighborhood’s most prominent landmarks.

CHM is home to a number of civic and cultural landmarks, including the historic Montebello State Hospital complex and Lake Montebello, a popular recreational and water infrastructure site. The area is served by the Coldstream-Homestead-Montebello Community Corporation (CHMCC), one of the oldest active neighborhood associations in Baltimore.

== Buildings and campus facilities ==
=== The Castle on the Hill ===
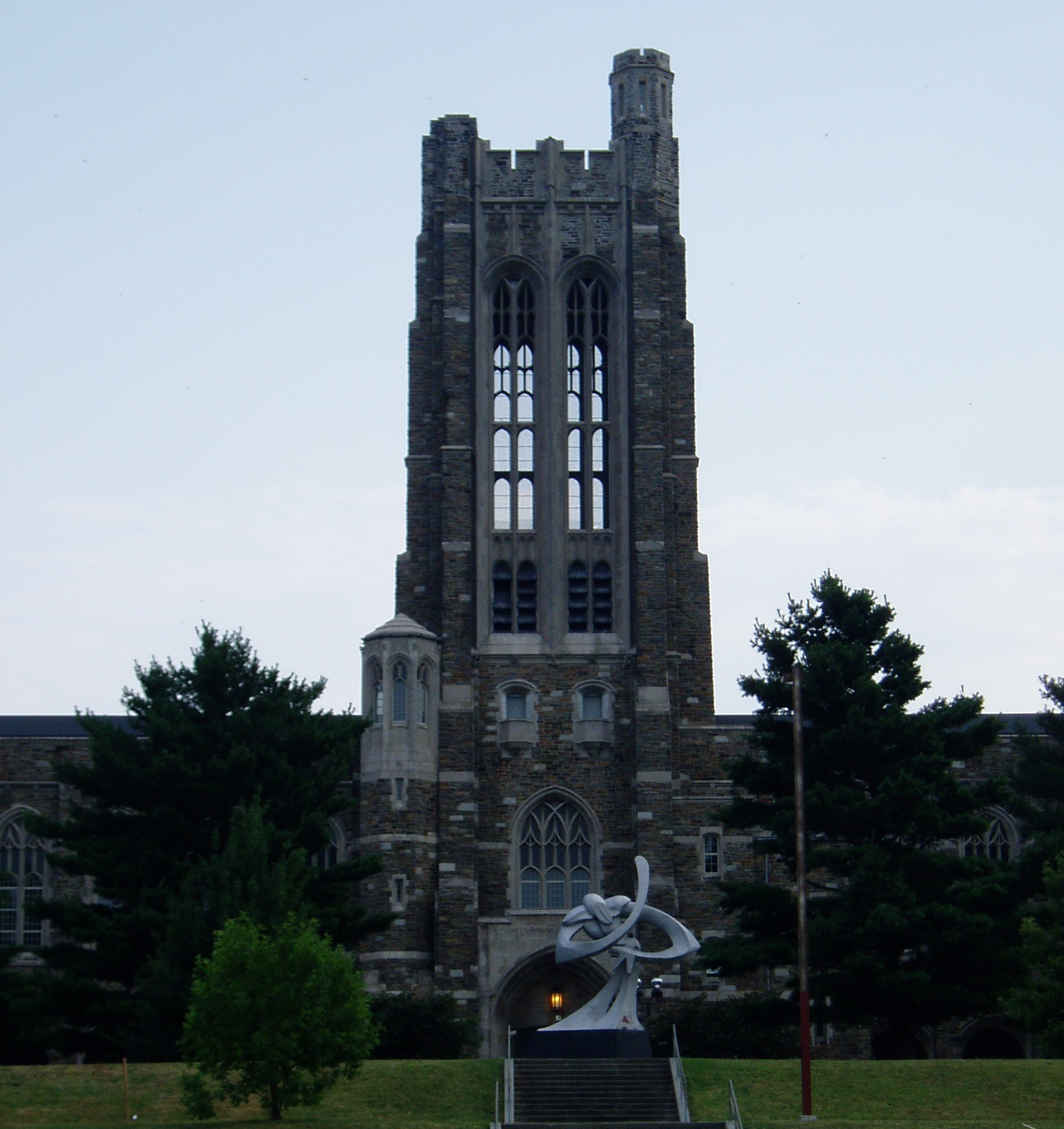
The 150-ft central tower of the Castle on the Hill soars above B.C.C's 38-acre campus known as Collegian Hill.

The main academic structure of Baltimore City College, known as "The Castle on the Hill," was constructed between 1926 and 1928 on a prominent hill in northeast Baltimore. Designed by the Baltimore architectural firm of Buckler and Fenhagen, the building exemplifies the Collegiate Gothic style, drawing inspiration from the medieval architecture of University of Oxford and Princeton University.

The building is constructed of random ashlar stone with Indiana limestone trim and stretches approximately 360 ft (110 m) in length by 300 ft (91 m) in width. Its defining feature is a 150-foot 150 ft (46 m) central tower, originally intended to house four large clock faces and a carillon bell system. These features were never installed due to funding constraints following the Stock Market Crash of 1929 and the onset of the Great Depression. The tower remains one of Baltimore’s most recognizable civic landmarks.

Symbolic carvings adorn the exterior, including owls (wisdom), squirrels (preparation), and even a parrot—thought to represent the school’s academic rival, the Baltimore Polytechnic Institute. The Latin inscription "Dimidium Scientiae Prudens Quaestio" (“Half of Knowledge is Asking the Right Question”) is carved beneath the parapet of the main tower.

Inside, the structure features wide Gothic-arched corridors, terrazzo flooring, carved oak panels, cathedral-style leaded glass windows, exposed beams, and high vaulted ceilings. The building also houses classrooms, seminar rooms, trophy halls, faculty offices, and ceremonial staircases clad in limestone.

==== William Donald Schaefer Auditorum ====
The auditorium at City College is a grand space featuring an arched proscenium, coffered ceiling, and Gothic Revival detailing. Designed as a central venue for assemblies, musical performances, and civic ceremonies, it reflects the school's architectural and academic prominence. Historic photographs reveal ornate molding, decorative lighting fixtures, and tiered seating, preserving the building’s 20th-century design integrity. In 2009, the auditorium was dedicated to alumnus William Donald Schaefer, who served as Mayor of Baltimore and the 58th Governor of Maryland. Today, the venue has seating for approximately 800 spectators, and is slated for a renovation to replace seating, flooring, and improve acoustics.

==== B.C.C. Archives ====
The B.C.C. Archives is a dedicated research and preservation space located within the Castle. It houses a curated collection of historical materials documenting the school’s legacy since its founding in 1839. The archive contains a wide array of primary sources, including:

- Complete volumes of The Green Bag yearbook (since 1896)
- Editions of The Collegian newspaper
- Historic photographs, diplomas, and commencement programs
- Artifacts such as trophies, uniforms, and banners
- Documentation of the Hall of Fame, Golden Apple Awards, and student societies

The archives were expanded and modernized with support from the Baltimore City College Foundation. It serves students, alumni, and researchers interested in the school’s civic, academic, and architectural history. Selected items have also been digitized in collaboration with institutions such as Digital Maryland.

=== Center for Teaching and Learning ===
The Center for Teaching and Learning (CTL) is a 13,000-square-foot learning commons and academic support facility located inside the Castle. Renovated in 2016, it includes these centers and venues:

==== Joseph Meyerhoff Library ====
The two-level library, located inside the Center for Teaching and Learning, was renovated in 2016. It features arched windows, exposed wooden beams, decorative paneling, and a central reading hall. The library serves as a central hub for research and study and includes dedicated spaces for digital media, archival materials, and classroom instruction. The facility is named for notable businessman and B.C.C. alumnus Joseph Meyerhoff.

==== The B.C.C. Writing Center ====
A peer tutoring center designed to equip students with the reading and writing support necessary to strengthen their academic performance, build their confidence, and foster a growth mindset.

==== The Reed Center for Mathematics and Science ====
A peer tutoring center which aims to lead students into a deep practical understanding of mathematical and scientific concepts in order to see the significance of math and science in life.

==== The Cordish Technology Center ====
The Cordish Technology Center supports the learning community by providing access to technology and resources.

=== Other spaces ===
- George Doetsch Hall (performance, ceremonial, and event space)
- The Gwaltney Study (quiet work space)

=== The Powerhouse Annex ===
Located approximately 170 feet (52 meters) east of the Castle is a two-story brick structure known as the Powerhouse Annex. Originally built in 1926 to house campus heating infrastructure on the ground level and shop classes on level one, the 23,568 SF building features Gothic architectural detailing consistent with the main structure, including arched windows and decorative brickwork. As of 2025, the Powerhouse Annex remains part of the functional campus and is slated for limited renovation. The structure will house the school's admissions office, college advising office, counseling services. The structure will also include renovated office space for CHMCC and a new school store.

=== Athletic facilities ===
==== George Petrides Stadium at Alumni Field ====
A 1,200-seat outdoor multi-purpose athletic facility. The stadium is both the home of the school's football, soccer, lacrosse, field hockey, and track and field programs and is a focal point for community events.

==== Athletics Center Complex ====
Located just southwest of the Castle is the school's gymnasium complex. The original gymnasium was constructed in 1976, totaling approximately 11,869 sq ft (1,102.7 m^{2}). A major renovation and expansion project, approved in 2025, will increase the athletics facility’s footprint to 45,265 sq ft (4,205.3 m^{2}). The new complex will include:

- A main gymnasium with two-sided retractable seating for 824 spectators for basketball games, assemblies, and special events
- An auxiliary gymnasium with retractable seating for 146 spectators for volleyball, wrestling, and physical education
- A central lobby and concourse to improve circulation and architectural connection to renovated natatorium inside the Castle
- New locker rooms for home and visiting teams
- Fitness and weight training center designed for daily student use and varsity athletics
- Athletic offices, meeting rooms, officials locker rooms, and coaching suites
- Sports medicine, physical therapy, and recovery spaces with direct access to both gymnasiums
- New ticket office, equipment storage rooms, equipment staging zones, and upgraded utility support systems
- New black box theater suite to support performing arts program

The design incorporates natural daylighting, sustainable materials, and improved acoustics. The exterior facade uses complementary tones and materials to echo the historic character of the main academic building while creating a distinct identity for the athletic wing.

== Architectural significance and preservation ==
B.C.C. is widely recognized for the architectural distinction of its main academic building, known as "The Castle on the Hill." Completed in 1928, the structure was designed by Riggin T. Buckler and G. Corner Fenhagen in the Collegiate Gothic style. The three-story building features a central 150-foot tower, random ashlar stonework with Indiana limestone trim, arched windows, carved gargoyles, buttresses, and ornamental tracery—reflecting both academic tradition and civic grandeur.

In 2003, the building was listed on the National Register of Historic Places for its architectural and educational significance. It was designated a Baltimore City Landmark in 2007, protecting its exterior from unsanctioned alteration.

In 2010, the Baltimore City College Alumni Association received a preservation award from Baltimore Heritage in recognition of its leadership in maintaining and restoring the campus. The school's careful stewardship of its historic character has included renovations that preserve original design elements while integrating modern systems and accessibility improvements.

In 2017, Architectural Digest named Baltimore City College the most beautiful public high school in Maryland and one of the most beautiful in the United States.

== 2025–2028 campus renovation ==
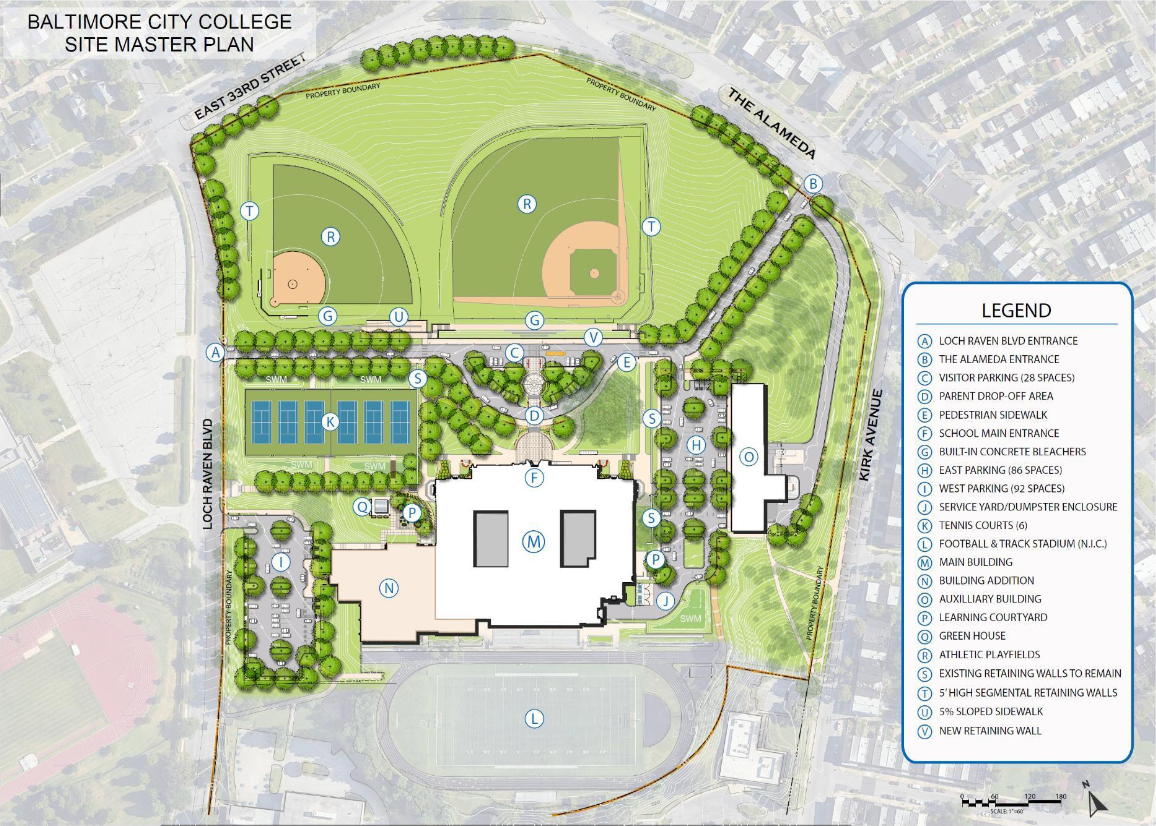
Illustration showing the Baltimore City College campus master plan following the 2025-28 renovation.

In 2025, Baltimore City College began a comprehensive, multi-year campus renovation project, marking the most significant investment in the school’s infrastructure since its construction in the 1920s. The renovation—planned by Baltimore City Public Schools in partnership with the Maryland Stadium Authority and led by design firm Samaha Associates and Davis Construction will modernize learning spaces, restore historic features, and ensure the building meets 21st-century educational and sustainability standards.

=== Scope and timeline ===
The renovation includes a full interior modernization of the 1926 main academic building while preserving its historic collegiate gothic architecture. Construction is scheduled from Summer 2025 to Summer 2028, with students and staff occupying a swing space at the University of Baltimore during the 2025–2026 through 2027–2028 school years. The restored Collegian Hill campus will reopen in time for the 2028–2029 academic year.

=== Design goals ===
The project is guided by the following design priorities:

- Full alignment with district educational specifications
- Safer circulation for pedestrians, cars, and buses
- Enhanced on-site security and access control
- Energy-efficient systems for occupant comfort
- Respect for the building’s architectural and civic significance

=== Building area and additions ===
The renovation will retain the existing exterior footprint but reorganize and upgrade interior spaces, including a substantial expansion of the athletic center:

- Main Academic Building: 264,690 SF across four levels (ground, 1st, 2nd, 3rd floors)
- Athletic Center: Expands from 20,087 SF competition gymnasium with 824 seats to 45,265 SF athletic center with a new 33,396 SF structure featuring a new auxiliary gym (146 seats), fitness center, locker rooms, PE classroom, and a dance/yoga studio.
- Powerhouse/Annex: Retains 23,568 SF across two levels for student support services like admissions, college advising, and counseling.

The total site remains approximately 34 acres, including athletic fields and stadium grounds.

=== Interior enhancements ===
Key interior upgrades include:

- Fully reconfigured classrooms and collaborative spaces
- New science labs, corridors, and restrooms
- A modernized auditorium with 779 seats
- A new split-level dining hall
- Preserved elements of historic interiors, including corridors and staircases

=== Exterior enhancements and access improvements ===
The 2025–28 campus modernization plan includes several significant improvements to the grounds and infrastructure. A new dedicated visitor parking area will be introduced to enhance accessibility and accommodate guests during school-day and special events. Pedestrian circulation and safety are being improved through new lighting, upgraded security systems, and reconfigured entrances.

The plan also includes a redesigned campus hardscape and landscape, with new paving, signage, and plantings that respect the site's historic character while improving stormwater management and wayfinding. The school's ceremonial axis—known as Hall of Fame Row is being extended from 33rd Street to Loch Raven Boulevard, reinforcing the visual and civic prominence of the main entrance and celebrating generations of distinguished alumni.

=== Swing space ===
From 2025 to 2028, the entire school community will temporarily relocate to a designated swing space at the University of Baltimore. Programming, staffing, and scheduling will continue without interruption during this relocation.

=== Milestones and phases ===
Major construction milestones include:

- Summer 2025 – Winter 2026: Demolition and abatement
- Winter 2026 – Summer 2026: Foundations, structure, and roofing
- 2026–2027: Interior rough-in
- 2027–2028: Final finishes and commissioning
- Summer 2028: Move-in and re-occupancy
