= Charles Tapper =

American football player (born 1993)

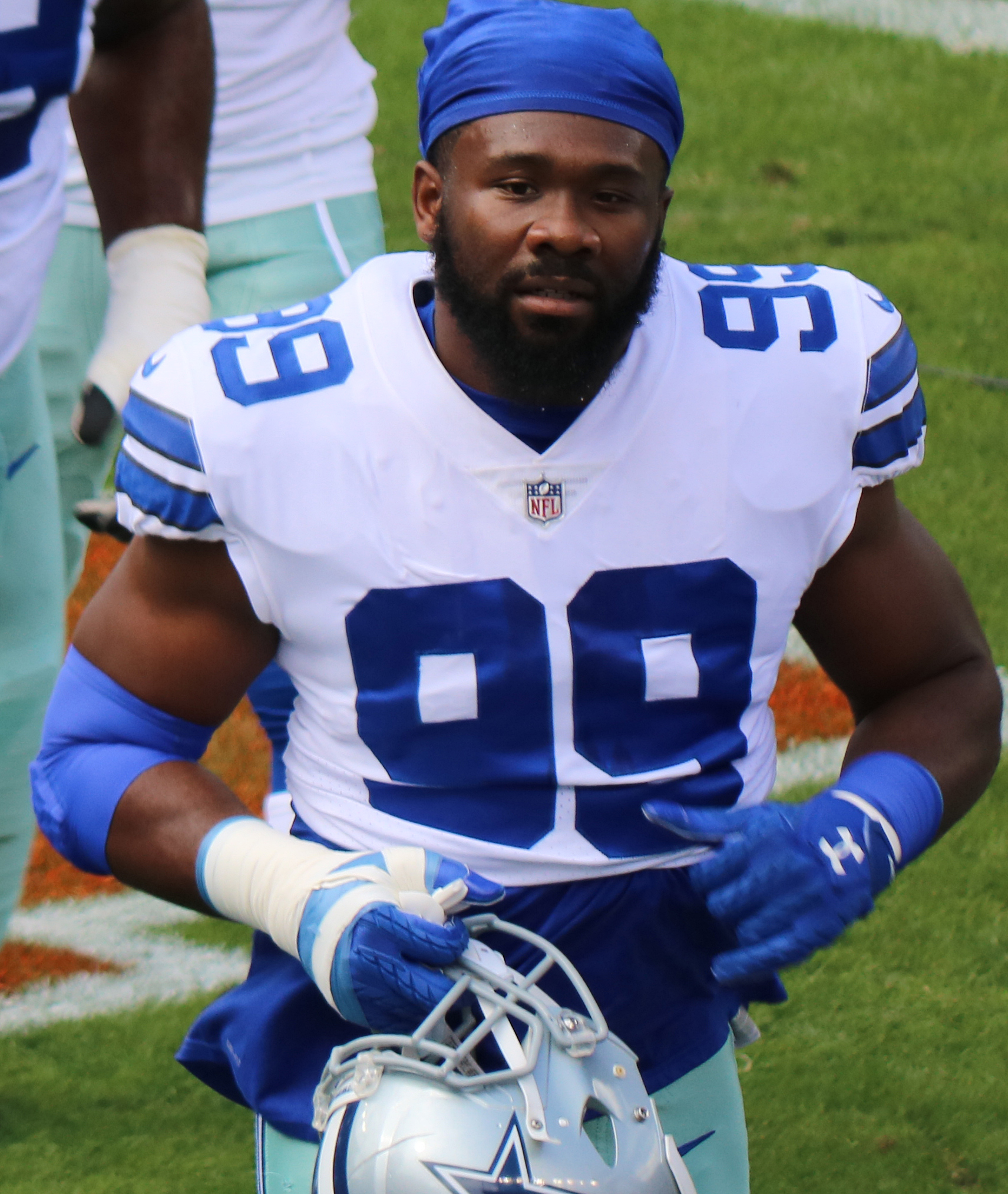
- Tapper with the Dallas Cowboys in 2017

No. 99
- Position: Defensive end

Personal information
- Born: May 7, 1993 (age 33); Baltimore, Maryland, U.S.
- Listed height: 6 ft 3 in (1.91 m)
- Listed weight: 270 lb (122 kg)

Career information
- High school: Baltimore City College
- College: Oklahoma
- NFL draft: 2016: 4th round, 101st overall pick

Career history
- Dallas Cowboys (2016–2017); New York Jets (2019)

Awards and highlights
- 2× First-team All-Big 12 (2013, 2015)

Career NFL statistics
- Games played: 2
- Total tackles: 3
- Sacks: 1
- Stats at Pro Football Reference

Charles Orville Tapper, Jr. (born May 7, 1993) is an American former professional football player who was a defensive end in the National Football League (NFL) for the Dallas Cowboys and New York Jets. He played college football for the Oklahoma Sooners.

== Early life ==
Tapper attended public schools in Baltimore, Maryland where his mother Rhonda Tapper worked as a school principal. Tapper's father died when he was 4 and he was raised by his mom. Rhonda Tapper later adopted two other boys for whom Charles served as a role model, flying them to Oklahoma to watch him play college football.

He enrolled at Baltimore City College, where he focused on basketball, before starting to play football as a junior, only after his mother asked him to join the team or get a job. He was a two-way player as a senior, finishing with 100 tackles and five sacks on defense, while also making 10 receptions for 200 yards and five touchdowns at tight end.

== College career ==
Tapper accepted a football scholarship from the University of Oklahoma. As a true freshman, he appeared in 5 games. He tallied his first 2 tackles in the sixth game against the University of Kansas.

As a sophomore, he became a starter at defensive end in a 3-4 defense, starting 12 games except the tenth contest against Iowa State University. He collected 49 tackles (nine for loss), 5.5 sacks and one pass defensed. He had 5 tackles and 2 sacks against Texas Christian University. He made 6 tackles (3 for loss) and 2 sacks against the University of Kansas.

As a junior, he started all 13 games at defensive end. He registered 37 tackles (eight for loss), three sacks, two passes defensed, one forced fumble and one fumble recovery. He had 5 tackles against the University of Texas. He made 6 tackles (1.5 for loss) against Oklahoma State University.

As a senior, he started all 13 games at defensive end. He posted 50 tackles (10 for loss), 7 sacks, 3 passes defensed, 4 forced fumbles and one fumble recovery. He had 8 tackles (one for loss) against West Virginia University. He made 6 tackles (2 for loss) and one sack against Baylor University. He had 6 tackles, one sack, one forced fumble and one fumble recovery against Texas Christian University.

== Professional career ==
Pre-draft measurables
Height	Weight	40-yard dash	Vertical jump	Broad jump	Bench press
6 ft 3 in (1.91 m)	271 lb (123 kg)	4.59 s	34 in (0.86 m)	9 ft 11 in (3.02 m)	23 reps
All values from NFL Combine.

=== Dallas Cowboys ===
Tapper was selected by the Dallas Cowboys in the fourth round (101st overall) of the 2016 NFL draft, to play defensive end in a 4-3 defense. In training camp he was diagnosed with a pre-existing back condition (pars defect) that had gone unnoticed since birth, which forced him to miss considerable time, including all of the preseason games and the first three weeks of the regular season. He was placed on injured reserve on September 28, 2016.

In 2017, he made his debut against the New York Giants and tallied his first career sack. He was declared inactive in 2 games with the return of Damontre Moore from suspension. On October 4, he suffered a right broken foot during practice. On October 5, he was placed on the injured reserve list after undergoing surgery.

On September 1, 2018, Tapper was waived by the Cowboys and was signed to the practice squad the next day. He was released on September 4.

=== New York Jets ===
On January 4, 2019, Tapper signed a reserve/future contract with the New York Jets. He was waived with a non-football injury designation on May 10. He was placed on the reserve/non-football injury list after clearing waivers on May 13.

On May 5, 2020, he was waived with a Non-Football injury designation. On June 8, 2020, Tapper announced his retirement from football.
