= Maryland Scholastic Association =

The Maryland Scholastic Association (MSA) was a high school sports league governing high school sports in the Baltimore metropolitan area. The MSA was established in 1919 and was initially led by Dr. Phillip H. Edwards, a former coach at and then-President of Baltimore City College. The league was established as a central coordinating entity to ensure fair competition and handle operational processes like scheduling games. The MSA was founded as two leagues of approximately six teams each "to allow the difference in strength among some of the teams." The winners from each league initially played to determine a city champion. Founding members of the MSA included Baltimore City College, Baltimore Polytechnic Institute, The Donaldson School, Dunham's School, Friends School of Baltimore, Loyola Blakefield, Mount Saint Joseph High School, Park School of Baltimore, William S. Marston School. Ultimately, MSA membership included public high schools from Baltimore City and surrounding counties, as well as Roman Catholic, other religious, and independent private schools.

The association was distinctive for its inclusive approach, uniting students from diverse economic, educational, and religious backgrounds. This inclusivity extended to racial integration in 1956, two years after the landmark "Brown vs. Board of Education" Supreme Court decision. The MSA integrated former "colored" schools in Baltimore City, such as Frederick Douglass High School and Paul Laurence Dunbar Community High School, into its ranks. Unlike the Maryland Public Secondary Schools Athletic Association (MPSSAA) which classified schools based on student population, the MSA classified schools based on their athletic track record and tradition in individual sports, regardless of size. This system allowed schools with smaller student bodies but strong athletic programs to compete in higher conferences.

The MSA was known for its high level of competition in various sports, with schools like City College, Polytechnic, and Edmondson High School excelling in football, and others like Mount St. Joseph's and Loyola achieving success in wrestling and swimming. Championships in the MSA were highly celebrated, with winners receiving polished mahogany plaques or framed certificates. A highlight of the MSA's sports calendar was the Thanksgiving Day double-header at Memorial Stadium, featuring the Calvert Hall-Loyola game and the City-Poly game. These events drew significant media attention and large crowds, reflecting the importance of high school sports in the Baltimore area at the time.

The league was successful until 1992 when the Baltimore City public high schools withdrew from the MSA to join the MPSSAA for the opportunity to compete for state championships. The league's private schools formed the Maryland Interscholastic Athletic Association (MIAA).

The MSA board voted to dissolve the organisation in August 1993.
