= Baltimore Polytechnic Institute =

The Baltimore Polytechnic Institute

Location
- 1400 West Cold Spring Lane at Falls Road (Maryland Route 25); Baltimore, Maryland 21209; United States; 39°20′48″N 76°38′41″W

Information
- School type: Public, Secondary school, High School and "Magnet" school (formerly single sex school, all – male, 1883–1974)
- Motto: "Uniting Theory and Practice"
- Established: 1883 on Courtland Street (in the 300 block, later renamed St. Paul Street/Place) and East Saratoga Street (opposite present-day terraced Preston Gardens)
- School board: Baltimore City Board of School Commissioners (est. 1829)
- School district: Baltimore City Public Schools (est.1829)
- Superintendent: Dr. Jermaine Dawson [CEO]
- Director: Mark Sawyer
- Faculty: 88
- Grades: 9–12
- Gender: 49% male; 51% female
- Enrollment: 1647
- Area: Urban
- Colors: Orange and Blue
- Song: "Poly Hymn" (tune of "The Navy Hymn")
- Fight song: "Poly Fight Song"
- Athletics conference: Maryland Public Secondary Schools Athletic Association (MPSSAA) since 1994 [formerly in the old public / private schools Maryland Scholastic Association – M.S.A. (1919–1994)]
- Sports: 23
- Mascot: "Poly Parrot"
- Nickname: B.P.I.; Poly; Polytechnic; Tech; The Institute
- Team name: "The Engineers"
- Rivals: The Baltimore City College ("The Black Knights" / "The Collegians")
- USNWR ranking: 2,167
- Newspaper: "The Poly Press" (est. 1909)
- Yearbook: "The Poly Cracker"
- Budget: $10,748,593.00 (fiscal year 2014)
- Website: www.bpi.edu

The Baltimore Polytechnic Institute, colloquially referred to as BPI, Poly, and The Institute, is a US public high school founded in 1883. Established as an all-male manual trade / vocational high school by the Baltimore City Council and the Baltimore City Public Schools, it has been a coeducational academic institution since 1974 that emphasizes sciences, technology, engineering, and mathematics ("STEM"). It is located on a 53-acre (21 ha) tract of land in North Baltimore on the east bank of the Jones Falls stream (running north to south). B.P.I. and the adjacent still all-girls population of the Western High School are located on the same huge joint campus at the northwest corner of West Cold Spring Lane and Falls Road.

== History ==
B.P.I. was founded in 1883, after Baltimorean Joshua Plaskitt petitioned the Baltimore municipal and school authorities to establish a school for instruction in engineering. The original school was named the Baltimore Manual Training School, and its first class was made up of about sixty students, all of them male. The official name of the new high school was changed a decade later in 1893 to "The Baltimore Polytechnic Institute" by the Baltimore City Board of School Commissioners of the Baltimore City Public Schools. The first principals at the B.M.T.S. were Dr. Richard Grady, followed by two American naval officers, Lieutenant John D. Ford (U.S.N.), and Lieutenant William King (U.S.N.). Lt. King had such long lasting beginning influence on the new technical high school's academic rigor and traditions giving the school a naval flavor in its early decades. Because of this seminal influence, the connecting structure at the new 1967 campus at Cold Spring and Falls (with a distinctive outside stone facade and engraving with the school name) between the two new building wings of the academic and engineering halls (future also renamed "Dehuff" and "Burkert Halls") which contains the hallowed Memorial Corridor filled with Poly historical and biographical wall plaques, displays and glass exhibit floor cabinets along with at the west end of the stained glass window, statue head bust and B.P.I. bronze seal imbedded in the floor (all imported from the old North Avenue building of 1913–1967) is situated here. This wing was renamed after him as "King Memorial Hall" as one of the three new main 1967 campus structures along with the others in the 1980s after the Institute's centennial celebration.

The first building location designated in 1883 for the new manual training / technical school was located in part of a former grammar (elementary) school building on the earlier former site of the old central City Spring and small surrounding pocket park from colonial era days of old Baltimore Town on now disappeared Courtland Street just north of East Saratoga Street. This area was three blocks northwest of the Baltimore City Courthouse and the adjacent historic Battle Monument square (commemorating from the British naval and land attack in the famous Battle of Baltimore and bombardment of Fort McHenry in the War of 1812 in September 1814).

It was unfortunately later contained in Baltimore's first "urban renewal" plan with the tearing down of five square blocks in this then northern reaches of Downtown Baltimore of what today would be architecturally significant and historic residential townhouses along old Courtland Street and the original Saint Paul Street (which paralleled it to the west), between Calvert Street to the east and Charles Street up the hill to the west. This major demolition project was to permit the construction of new terraced "Preston Gardens" and adjacent Saint Paul Place which ran from East Centre Street in the north to East Lexington Street in the south occurred at the end of the mayoral administration of James H. Preston in 1919–1920. It was occupied by numerous African American black professionals and commercial offices in this downtown district and the razing and creation of the terraced gardens was to protect the nearby wealthy cultural Mount Vernon-Belvedere neighborhood on the heights to the west and north around the historic Washington Monument from any unwanted racial encroachment.

The old Courtland Street was wiped out and replaced by the terraced gardens and a landscaped St. Paul Place in the five blocks. The former B.M.T.S. / B.P.I. building was on the east side (and earlier elementary school structure it occupied dating back to the 1840s) after the high school moved further north to East North Avenue and North Calvert Street in 1912–1913. Two decades later by 1935 it became home to the newly established Baltimore City Department of Public Welfare (now renamed Social Services Department) during the famous economic collapse of the Great Depression era and continued there for three decades. The Courtland / St. Paul Street / Place structures complex was later purchased / annexed by neighboring Mercy Hospital, (which was formerly named "Baltimore City Hospital"), for its westward expansion located originally one block to the east on North Calvert and East Saratoga Streets, on the northwest corner since the 1840s and its reorganization in the early 1870s. These old 19th century Poly / Public Welfare buildings were then later torn down in the early 1960s for construction of their first modern hospital tower (now renamed McCauley Building) in 1964. It recently also supplemented by additional major construction of the adjacent high-rise Bunting Tower hospital facilities in the 2010s.

In 1983, at the technology high school's centennial observation and celebration, a large historical bronze plaque was placed and dedicated with ceremonies of City officials, B.C.P.S. staff and B.P.I. administration / faculty / students and alumni in the St. Paul Place West lobby of the Mercy Hospital complex commemorating that earlier first home of the Manual Training School for 30 years, later to become "Poly".

It just so happened that these original Poly buildings were and situated across the same street of Courtland 44 years later, (almost a half-century) after their long-time arch-rival public high school, The Baltimore City College, (then known only as "The High School" for its first five years) was earlier established facing the same street in a rented small two-story rowhouse with pitched roof and dormer attic window in October 1839 where it remained for only a few short years to 1843, also on the same now vanished narrow alley-like Courtland Street. Both schools began on the same street a short distance from each other separated by a near half-century of time.

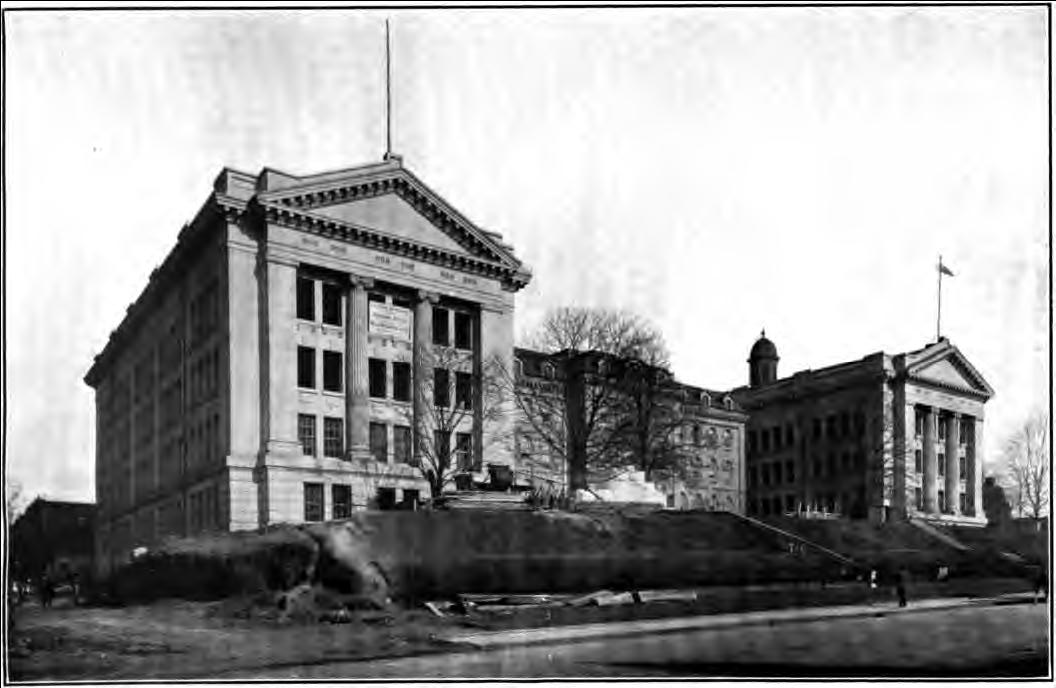
Baltimore Polytechnic Institute (as it appeared between 1913 and 1931 with the center section of the old original mansion of the Maryland School for the Blind from c. 1866 still standing) in its second of three geographic locations / buildings. On the north side of the 200 block of East North Avenue (formerly known as Boundary Avenue), occupied here 1913 to 1967. Additional replacement center wing and auditorium . gymnasium wing to the east constructed 1931. This structure complex later renamed after B.P.I. moved to Cold Spring Lane and Falls Road in 1967 and served 17 more years in the Baltimore City Public Schools system for various school facilities and renamed as the "Calvert Educational Center". It was partially razed and underwent major renovations / reconstruction in the mid-1980s to become the B.C.P.S. "Alice Pinderhughes Administrative Headquarters" (nicknamed "North Avenue"), on the site between North Calvert Street to the west and Guilford Avenue to the east.

=== Relocation ===
Due to continued growth of the student population of the City's Public Schools system in the early 20th century and especially in the growing demand for higher secondary education at high schools like at the B.P.I.and the rival B.C.C. and the two girls high schools of Eastern and Western, the City's technical school relocated after a long public campaign for larger better facilities ten blocks further north from downtown in 1913 to Calvert Street and North Avenue (formerly known as Boundary Avenue, of the old City / County line of 1818–1888. The former old 1860s era converted mansion of French Second Empire style architecture of the former Maryland School for the Blind was purchased. It was sitting on a slight hill above the avenue in a then rural / suburban setting. Two additional massive three-story wings on the east and west sides of the center mansion were constructed and added by the City with a Greek Revival architecture with Classical style columns on the front facade. Now for the first time in its 30 years history "Tech" had a suitable building expansive enough to handle both its academic and technical education requirements. But the growth of "The Institute" was so much that in only a decade and a half by 1930, the old original central wing of "The Mansion" from the Blind School was razed after only 17 years and replaced by a simpler center three-story wing between the two flanking earlier 1913 structures with an additional large enormous auditorium / gymnasium in a further east wing facing North Avenue and towards adjacent Guilford Avenue were constructed. This massive assembly hall and physical education building with swimming pool was the largest built at the time in the city and the auditorium served many secular / civic / cultural occasions and events in town for decades into the mid-1980s. While at this location, the high school expanded both its academic, technical and athletic programs under the extensive longtime leadership of legendary Dr. Wilmer Dehuff, who was the fourth principal from 1921 to 1958.

Principal Dehuff despite his many accomplishments in his long educational career and his devotion and love of Poly, unfortunately in his view opposed and reluctantly (see below) oversaw the racial integration of the technology high school in September 1952, the first instance in the American Upper South region with the City of Baltimore public schools admitting African-American – then called "Negro" / "Colored" students. The Baltimore City Public Schools (founded 1829), had maintained racially segregated schools since first beginning public education for its black minority in Baltimore in 1870. The nationally famous precedent occurred two years before the rest of the nation took up this serious issue of inequality and discrimination addressed finally by the Supreme Court of the United States in May 1954 in the famous case of Brown vs. Board of Education of Topeka, Kansas. Previous black students in Baltimore City (and from adjacent Baltimore County also) had attended the Frederick Douglass High School (formerly named the "Colored High School" up to 1923 – second oldest in the nation – founded the same year as Poly – 1883) on the westside of town and the later opening Paul Laurence Dunbar High School in East Baltimore. Dr. Dehuff later after his retirement in 1958 and his 37 years career at the Polytechnic Institute, became the president and dean of faculty at the then private institution, the University of Baltimore on Mount Royal Avenue.

=== Integration/desegregation ===
Most Baltimore City public schools since 1870 were not integrated until after the Supreme Court decision in Brown v. Board of Education of May 1954 in the following September / Fall semester. B.P.I. since the 1920s had an unusually advanced and difficult college-level mathematics, engineering and technology oriented "A" Course, the "Advanced College Preparatory Curriculum" instituted back in the 1920s as part of then Public Schools reform and improvement program. It included calculus, analytical chemistry, electricity, mechanics and surveying; these subjects were not offered at the black high schools in the city before 1952. But a parallel "A" Course centered on the humanities / social studies / liberal arts was also longtime since the '20s offered at arch-rival City College with a similar degree of rigorous quality. But its focus was in different fields. Other "A" Courses were similarly available at the two also all-white and all-girls Eastern and Western High Schools, both founded 1844. B.P.I. was a whites-only school but supported by municipal taxes on the general population. No black schools in the city (black students could not attend whites-only schools) offered such courses, nor did they have classrooms, labs, libraries or teachers comparable to those at B.P.I. or at the similar level of The Baltimore City College.

Because of this, a group of 16 Baltimoreans African American students, with help and support from their parents, along with the Baltimore Urban League, and the NAACP (National Association for the Advancement of Colored People) applied for the mathematics / engineering "A" Course at the Poly; the applications were initially denied and so the students sued in local Maryland state circuit court.

The subsequent trial began on June 16, 1952. The NAACP's intentions were to end segregation at the 70-year-old public high school. In the B.P.I. case they argued that BPI's offerings of specialized engineering courses violated the "separate but equal" clause because these courses were not offered in high schools for black students. To avoid integration, an out-of-court proposal was made to the Baltimore School Board to start an equivalent "A" Course at the "colored" (for non-whites) of Frederick Douglass High School. This hearing on the "Douglass" plan lasted for hours, with longtime Poly Principal Dehuff and others arguing that separate but equal "A" Courses would satisfy constitutional requirements and NAACP attorney Thurgood Marshall (soon to be later famous appointed Justice on the U.S. Supreme Court in 1967), arguing that the plan was a gamble and additional cost that the city should not take. By a vote of 5–3, the board decided that a separate "A" course would not provide the same educational opportunities for African American students, and that, starting that fall, African American students could attend Poly. The vote vindicated the NAACP national strategy of raising the economic cost of 'separate but equal' schools beyond what taxpayers and their government bureaucracy were willing to pay. Thirteen African American students, Leonard Cephas, Carl Clark, William Clark, Milton Cornish, Clarence Daly, Victor Dates, Alvin Giles, Bucky Hawkins, Linwood Jones, Edward Savage, Everett Sherman, Robert Young, and Silas Young, finally entered the Polytechnic Institute that fall. They were unfortunately faced daily with racial epithets, threats of violence and isolation from many of the more than 2,000 fellow students then at the school on North Avenue. But they endured, kept their cool and composure, knowing what was at stake. The first of those students to graduate from Poly was Dr. Carl O. Clark in June 1955. Dr. Clark went on to become the first African-American to graduate from the University of South Carolina with a degree in physics in 1976.

=== Modern campus (1960s–present) ===
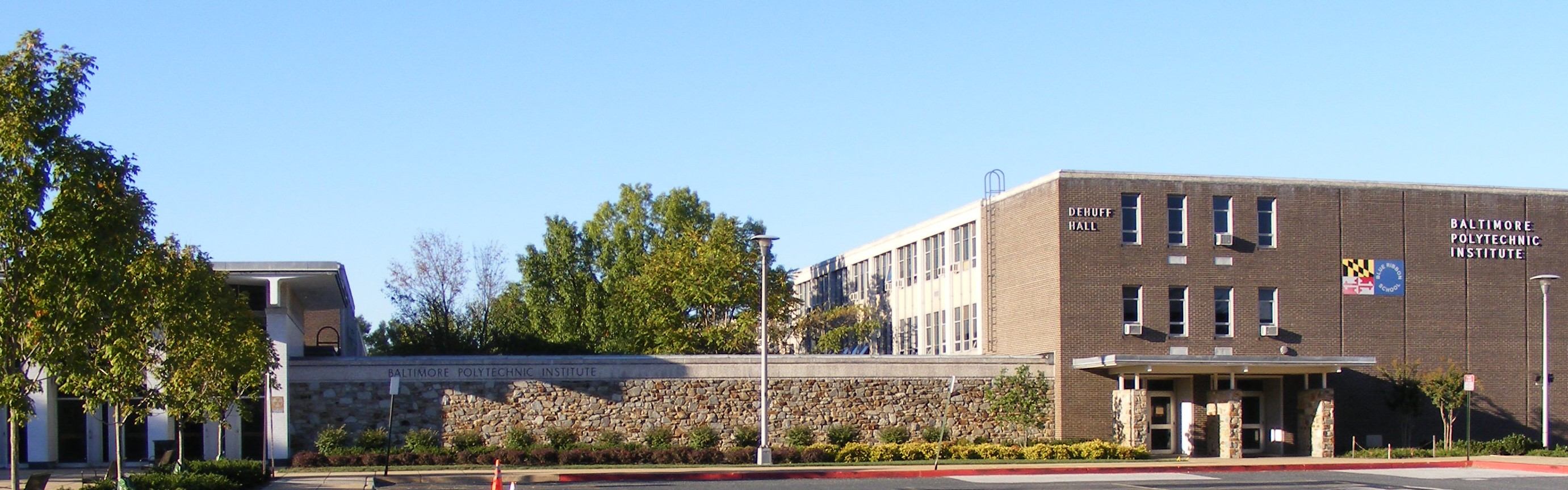
Baltimore Polytechnic Institute's 1967 campus at northwest corner of West Cold Spring Lane and Falls Road (Maryland Route 25), alongside the Jones Falls stream to the west and elevated Jones Falls Expressway (Interstate 83)
left – Burkert Hall (engineering building) obscured by trees, center – is the single story King Memorial Hall with outside decorative stone facade and school nameplate, to the right – is Dehuff Hall (academic building) – all renamed in 1983

In September 1967, after a multi-year planning and construction project, then-fifth principal Claude Burkert (1958–1969) oversaw the relocation of his school after 54 years at North Avenue and Calvert Street to its current location at 1400 West Cold Spring Lane, a fifty-three-acre tract of land bordering the Jones Falls stream to the west (and adjacent elevated Jones Falls Expressway (Interstate 83) and with Falls Road (Maryland Route 25} and the heights of the Roland Park residential planned community from the 1890s to the east along Cold Spring Lane, and to the south is the Hampden and Woodberry neighborhoods. Further to the north along Falls Road is the Village of Cross Keys shopping mall and planned residential community also developed during the 1960s by the noted James Rouse.

At the time of the 1965–1967 building of the "New Poly-Western", it was considered one of the largest and most expensive school construction projects in the nation up to that time. A century before, this site along the Jones Falls was occupied by earthworks fortifications for the Union Army, then militarily occupying Southern-sympathizing Baltimore City during the American Civil War.

Also occupying this site on its east side facing Falls Road is the new Western High School, an all-girls school founded in 1844.

Notable buildings on the B.P.I. campus include Dehuff Hall, also known formerly as the Academic Hall building, named for the longtime fourth principal where students attend normal classes, and Burkert Hall, also previously called the Engineering Hall building, remembering the fifth principal, where students attend classes in the Willard Hackerman Engineering Program. (Hackerman, a noted Poly alumnus and local / regional engineering / construction firm founder). Both Western High girls and Poly students make use of the auditorium/cafeteria complex in-between the two high schools, and likewise share the swimming pool and sports fields. Although the two schools share these facilities, their respective academic programs and classrooms are completely separate from one another.

In 1974 after some controversy and a local court case, the Baltimore Polytechnic Institute officially became coeducational when it began admitting female students for the first time in almost 90 years. The first female to enroll and successfully graduate from the "A" Course was an African-American named Cindy White (1974–1978).

Coincidentally five years later, rival Baltimore City College, also with an all-boys student body since its founding in 1839, also admitted girls, becoming co-educational in 1979 after undergoing a major two-years long $10 million dollars renovation / reconstruction project and academic reorganization and revitalization program at its landmark "Castle on the Hill" 1922–1928 edifice on "Collegian Hill" at 33rd Street and The Alameda.

In the late 1980s the title "principal" of the Polytechnic Institute was changed to "director." After the retirement of Director John Dohler in 1990, Barbara Stricklin became the first woman to head the "magnet" high school, as she accepted the title of Interim Director.

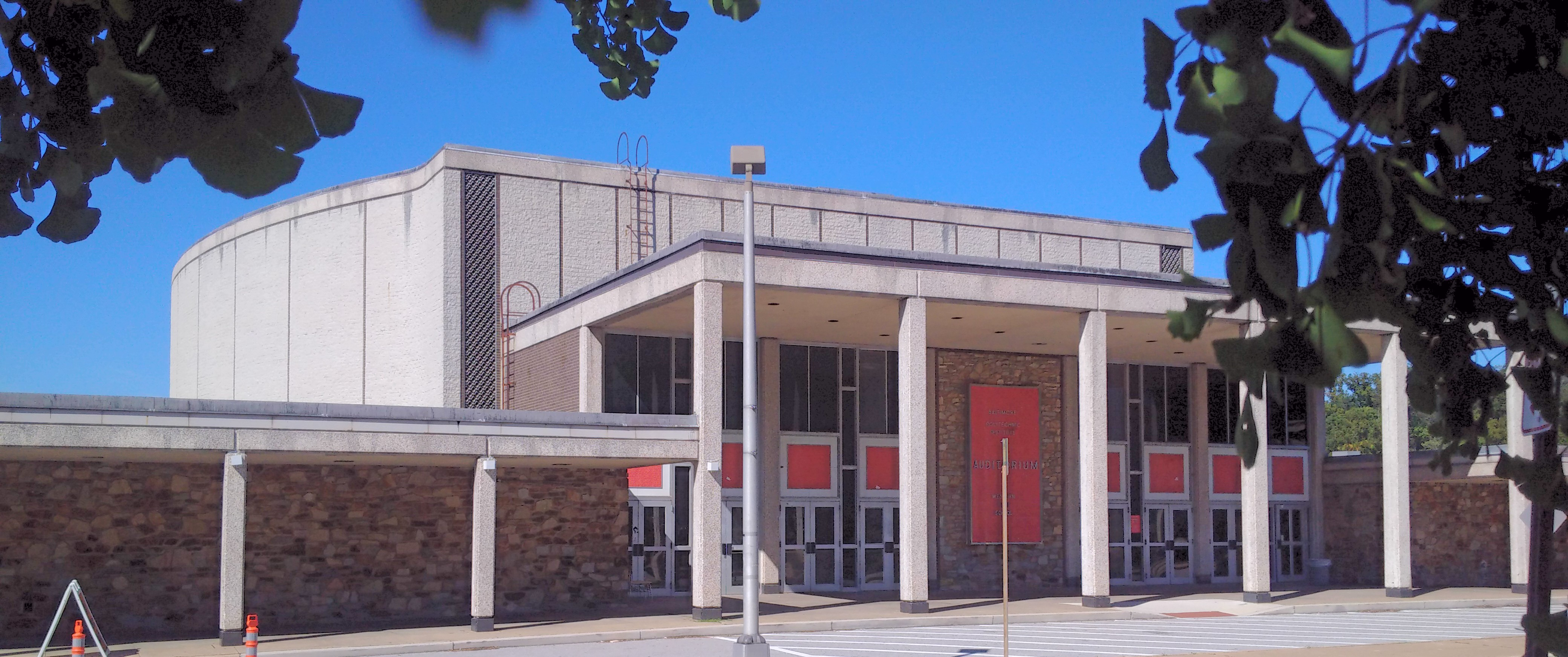
Auditorium built 1966–1967, shared by Polytechnic Institute and Western High School students

During Director Ian Cohen's tenure (1994–2003), Poly's curriculum was again expanded when it began offering Advanced placement (A.P.) classes. During the 2001–2002 school year, Poly was recognized by the Maryland State Department of Education when it was named a "Blue Ribbon School of Excellence." In 2011, Poly was ranked 1552 nationally and 44 in Maryland as a "Silver Medal School" by U.S. News & World Report magazine.

In 2004, Dr. Barney Wilson, a 1976 Poly graduate, became Baltimore Polytechnic Institute's first African-American director. Following his six years tenure in August 2010, assistant principal Matthew Woolston, was appointed interim director. Later on during that academic year, Jacqueline Williams was appointed as interim director for the subsequent 2011–2012 school year. By the end of that term – and after a parallel two-year, nationwide search – Williams became the first female director of the Polytechnic Institute. Williams had worked her way through the Poly ranks from student (Class of 1981), to faculty as teacher, then department head, to assistant principal, and to dean of students, before appointment to her position as B.P.I. director. Recently during the 2022–2023 school year, it was announced that Ms. Williams would be retiring after 12 years as Poly's academic head. In June 2023, another Poly alum, Mark Sawyer was named director, a position he holds to this day.

== Academics ==
Poly is a longtime "magnet school" for over 141 years, with specialized courses drawing students from across Baltimore's regular district boundaries in the Baltimore City Public Schools system (including a number of additional students from surrounding suburban counties in Maryland paying supplemental tuition). Admission to the Polytechnic Institute is highly competitive. Course concentrations include: the Honors S.T.E.M. Program; the Ingenuity Project offering advanced science, math, and academic research courses; AP Capstone emphasizing Social Sciences and Humanities; Computer Science; and the United States Air Force-sponsored Air Force Junior Reserve Officer Training Corps (JROTC). In its 2019 nationwide survey of STEM programs spanning 2015–2019, Newsweek magazine ranked Poly No. 36 among U.S. high schools.

== Athletics ==
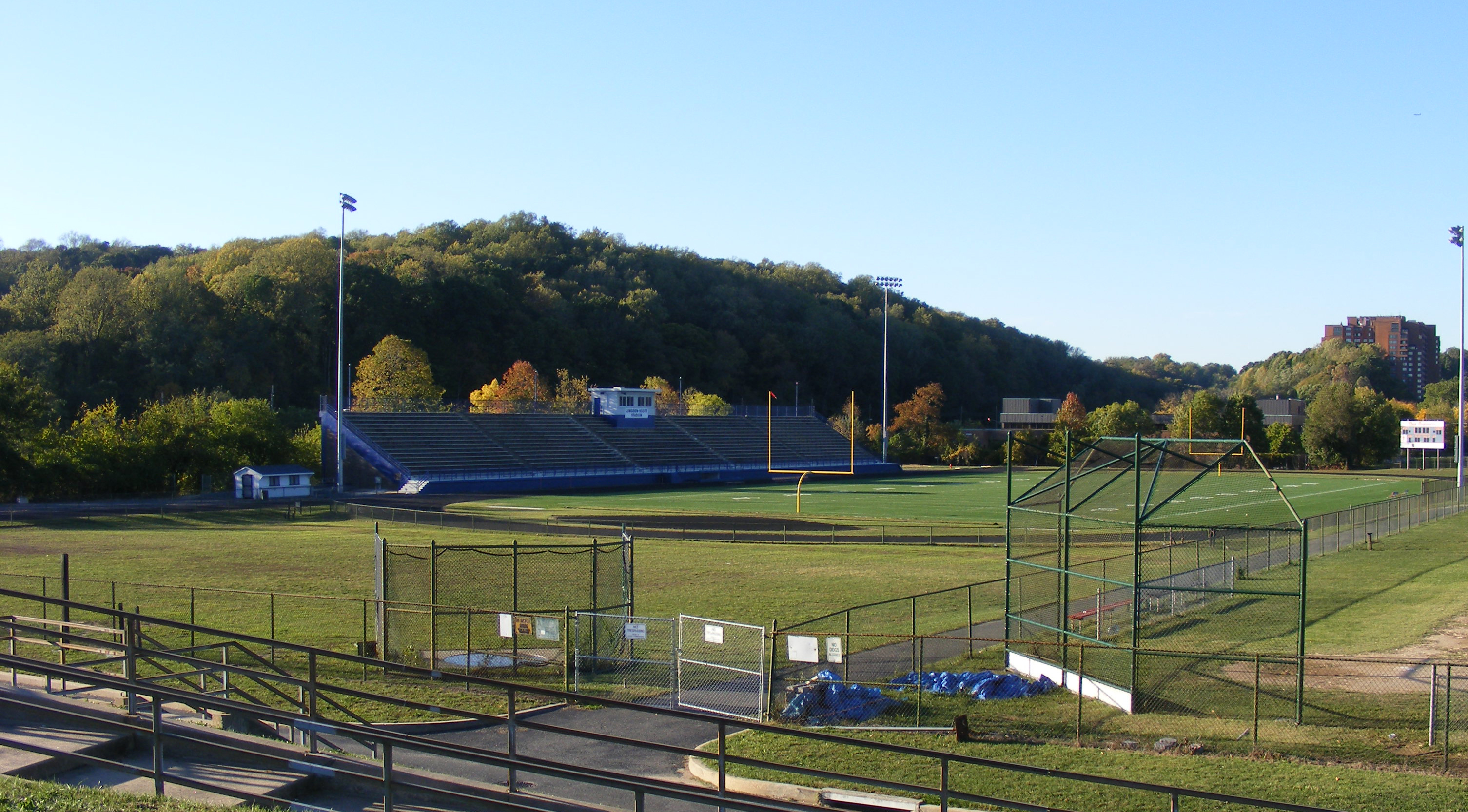
Poly's Lumsden-Scott Stadium

In addition to the school's football program, Poly's sports include basketball, soccer, cross-country, track and field, lacrosse, baseball, hockey, swimming, tennis, volleyball, and wrestling. The boys' basketball team won three state championship titles in a row between 2016 and 2019. The Poly "Engineers" baseball team has won nine Baltimore City championships since 2005 under head coach Corey Goodwin.

=== Football ===
Since the early 1900s the "Engineers" of the Polytechnic Institute, along with longtime arch-rival The Baltimore City College's, "Collegians" / "Black Knights" had dominated the old public – private schools athletic league of the Maryland Scholastic Association (M.S.A.) which existed 1919 to 1993 in the local prep sports scene. However, since joining the newer state-wide Maryland Public Secondary Schools Athletic Association (MPSSAA – founded 1946) in 1993, Poly made it to the final playoff football game once in 1993, the semi-finals once in 1997 and the quarterfinals in 1994 and 1998.

==== Poly and City ====
The Poly-City football rivalry is the oldest American football rivalry in Maryland and one of the oldest public school rivalries in the United States.

The rivalry here in "The Monumental City" began in the Autumn of 1889, when a team from The Baltimore City College ("City" "Collegians") then situated at North Howard and West Centre Streets since 1875 with its first structure of two (which unfortunately collapsed in August 1892 because of undermining from construction of the underground Howard Street Tunnel bypassing congested Downtown Baltimore for the Baltimore and Ohio Railroad). After seven years of temporary exile in a former elementary school building they returned again to the same site at Howard and Centre to a new larger home followed in 1899, remaining there although increasingly overcrowded until the move to the "Castle" in 1928. The City College is reputed to be the third oldest public high school / secondary school in the nation, established 1839. and had unofficial student teams playing rugby and various earlier versions of American football starting back in the 1870s. Meanwhile, the B.M.T.S. / B.P.I. was in its also cramped quarters on Courtland Street (today's Saint Paul Street / Place / "Preston Gardens" site) and both public secondary schools in those days were with no campus or athletic fields, so forced to use nearby municipal parks like newly purchased Clifton or older Patterson or Druid Hill Parks. The two teams from neighboring all-boys high schools which were seven blocks apart in Downtown Baltimore, met in the new municipal Clifton Park (of the late noted Baltimore merchant / banker / philanthropist Johns Hopkins (1795–1873) summer / country estate and mansion "Clifton") against a team of "scrubs" from the new Baltimore Manual Training School (the future renamed Baltimore Polytechnic Institute ("Poly") four years later in 1893), then located on the northeast corner of the former Courtland / now St. Paul Street and East Saratoga Street in Downtown Baltimore. It has continued annually every Fall season in numerous locations, parks and fields, most notably at the new Homewood Field of the "Blue Jays" of The Johns Hopkins University at their new spacious campus off North Charles Street and University Parkway, where they moved in 1914. City leads the series with the record standing at 66–62–6.

Little is known of the first American football game between the Manual Training School ancestor of the Baltimore Polytechnic Institute ("Poly") and The Baltimore City College ("City") in the Fall of 1889, (no mention in the several Baltimore daily newspapers back then) except that a junior varsity team from Poly met City's "scrubs", in the newly purchased Clifton Park in the northeast section of the old Baltimore City and that City emerged the victor for the next decade and a half, as the B.C.C. was then playing an ambitious schedule then against several regional colleges / universities opponents and played in a regional football league composed of upper levels of higher education in the late 19th and early 20th centuries. That began the oldest football rivalry in Maryland schools, the region and the nation, City's "Collegians" continued to win regularly against upstart Poly through 1901, however in 1902, for the only time in history of the series no game was played; though, in 1931, an extra game was played to compensate. Between 1903 and 1906, City won the series, but the tide soon turned in 1907, when the first tie in the 18th match of the series occurred. The next year in the 19th clash in 1908, Poly scored its first victory in the almost two decades long athletic rivalry now gaining widespread popularity and following among Baltimore sports fans and publicity in the sports pages of the several daily papers in town.

Poly dominated the series in the subsequent 1910s. The only year of that decade that City won was 1912, and between 1914 and 1917, Poly shut out City. Poly's streak continued through 1921, completing a nine-year winning streak, which City finally broke in 1922 with a 27–0 victory. During this time for the next three decades, many P.-C. games would be played at the newly built football bowl of Municipal Stadium (a.k.a. the Baltimore Stadium or as Venable Park Stadium on the north side of the newly landscaped 33rd Street boulevard in the former Venable Park, seating almost 100,000 and constructed in six months in a crash-program during 1923. It would serve the city and visiting college teams like Army (West Point) and Navy (Annapolis), Maryland (College Park), Notre Dame and others. In 1946 with the peace after World War II, it was the site also of the first professional football team in town, the first incarnation of the Baltimore Colts in the new All America Football Conference and then followed into the later merger with the National Football League in 1950. Old Municipal Stadium endured up to 1949 housing both minor league Baltimore Orioles of the International League when their old home of Oriole Park (the fifth one, built 1914 originally as Terrapin Park for the Baltimore Terrapins of the short-lived Federal League) on Greenmount Avenue and 29th Street in nearby Waverly neighborhood burned down in a spectacular blaze after the Fourth of July in 1944 and the two pro football Colts franchises when a multi-year project began in 1949 reconstructing, expanding and adding an upper deck to become the new Memorial Stadium reopening in the Spring of 1954 to greet the new Major League Baseball team in the American League of the transplanted new Baltimore Orioles, moving from St. Louis (as the former lackluster St, Louis Browns).

At the same time Poly-City football continued there on 33rd Street also moved into the new rebuilt athletic bowl continuing holding annual gridiron renewals of sports combat here attracting crowds of 30 to 40,000 fans in the pre-national sports franchises era, continuing on 33rd until the 1990s. Scheduled on Thanksgiving Day afternoons and with traditional students, cheerleaders, floats and teams parades west from City's "Castle" and north from old Poly on North Avenue were popular. Plus tailgating in the surrounding old stadium parking lots and checking out the earlier activities of the morning football game between Roman Catholic high schools Calvert Hall and Loyola.

In 1926, was one of the most famous Poly-City games ever played. Prior to the game, the eligibility of City's halfback, Mickey Noonen, was challenged. A committee was formed to investigate Noonen's eligibility, but Noonen's father—frustrated with the investigation—struck one of the members of the committee. The result was that Noonen was not only barred from the "Collegians" team, but also expelled from the Baltimore City Public Schools system. The 1930s ushered in a period of resurgence for the City "Castlemen" team, now ensconced in their new spacious hilltop campus of "Collegian Hill" at 33rd and The Alameda and the landmark "Castle on the Hill" since 1928. Poly, which had dominated in the previous two decades, only picked up two wins in the entire decade.

In 1934, B.P.I. student Harry Lawrence, who had kicked the winning field goal against City in the 1926 fall classic, later became the head coach at his arch-rival City College, serving during some of its successful seasons in the following decade and subsequently joining the B.C.C. faculty as a guidance counselor from the '30s into the 1970s, becoming a well-known figure at City college and only Poly alumnus inducted into the B.C.C. Hall of Fame.

It was during these times that the longtime local afternoon daily newspaper The Evening Sun (published 1910–1995, part of the three published papers of The Baltimore Sunpapers (with the morning paper The Sun begun 1837)) from the A.S. Abell & Company commissioned a bronze statue of a crouched football player on a mahogany wood base known as "The Evening Sun Trophy" and several were made over the next half century with each school keeping it for showing off in the exhibit glass cases in the following year in the Poly "Memorial Corridor" or City's central "Trophy Hall", and being retired after a number of victories. Several were made over the decades and each school still has some on display as cherished historical icons of past glories.

Printed program booklets were published annually by a joint Poly-City student / faculty committee with supporter advertising front and back with team group photos and rosters, player / coach biographies, and photos plus the administration, page of City and Poly songs and cheers, photos of each school building and school seals, lists of the previous years of scores of victories, and defeats. The prized collector's items began in the early 1920s and continued up to the mid-1970s. Special editions of the two student newspapers "The Poly Press" (founded 1922) and "The Collegian" (established 1929) were also packed with advertising from local commercial businesses and ads from various homeroom / classes, organizations, clubs and individuals. "The Collegian" was printed on orange newsprint paper to match the black ink for their school colors of "The Black & Orange". They frequently continued the fun tradition of replicating satire of the opponent's student paper so memorable versions appeared of "The Folly Mess" (subtitled "A Folly institution since A.D. 922") reporting the "Baltimore Follytechnique Institution" and "The Collitchin" (with its twisted slogan "serving the student morons of the Baltimore Seedy Collage") of the climate at the "Dump on the Hump" and making fun of the other's administration, faculty, coaches, buildings, diplomas, and education.

Poly won five straight games against City to open the 1950s, and 9 of the decade's 10 games, under its legendary coach Bob Lumsden, for whom the school's current football stadium is now named. Lumsden finished with an 11–7 record against City when he retired as "Engineers" head coach in 1966. He also coached 9–0 Poly to the unofficial National High School Championship Game at Miami, Florida's huge landmark Orange Bowl stadium in 1962, against the Miami High School "Stingarees", but Poly lost by a score of 14–6.

With both secondary schools packed to almost 4,000 male students each because of the post-Second World War "baby boom" plus slowness in new construction and were heavily overcrowded, sometimes operating on split -shifts, but the scholastic sports programs continued to prosper, strive and inspire generations of Poly and City boys.

The "Blue and Orange" team's fortunes changed later in the 1960s, when City was coached during the decade by their legendary coach George Young. Young (a Calvert Hall alumnus, City College history teacher and future Baltimore Colts front office executive and later to lead the New York Giants pro football team and finish his sports career as an NFL executive), guided his "Black Knights" teams to six wins over Poly, and an equal number of the old Maryland Scholastic Association (M.S.A.) "A Conference" championships. One of Young's most memorable victories occurred on Thanksgiving Day, 1965, at the old Memorial Stadium on 33rd Street, when undefeated City's "Black Knights" beat the also previously undefeated Poly "Engineers" by the largest margin score ever, 52–6.

Baltimore City's public high schools withdrew in 1993 from the old Maryland Scholastic Association, a unique public / private / independent and parochial schools athletic league in central Maryland, organized in 1919, and joined the newer larger statewide Maryland Public Secondary Schools Athletic Association (MPSSAA), organized in 1946. This was mandated by a new Superintendent of Schools who had earlier spent his career in the neighboring suburban Baltimore County public schools system who were original charter members of the competing MPSSAA which had grown in the postwar period and he wanted the City schools to participate in the statewide playoffs tournaments in the various sports (with championship games played at the large venues of Byrd Stadium and Cole Fieldhouse arena at the University of Maryland at College Park, northwest of Washington, D.C. in suburban Prince George's County or later in other large state public universities / colleges). This change meant that the scholastic football season would end earlier to allow for the beginning of state-wide playoffs in the M.P.S.S.A.A., forcing Poly and City to move their annual century-old game in 1994 from its longtime traditional holiday date for decades of Thanksgiving Day holiday afternoon to the less memorable first Saturday in November, and a subsequent loss of high attendance, publicity and media coverage with occasional radio / television broadcasts. They also missed playing with the longtime holiday double-header tradition with the morning "Catholic Game" at the 33rd Street stadium between Roman Catholic high schools' similar arch-rivalry between Calvert Hall College ("Cardinals") versus Loyola High School at Blakefield ("Dons"), played since 1920 (now in their 104th game).

Then Poly and City met for the 119th time in November 2007, a contest unfortunately marred by the outbreak of a large brawl outside the new M&T Bank Stadium, southwest of downtown where the annual Fall Football Classic for the oldest public and Catholic high schools had been relocated in the redeveloped Camden Yards Sports Complex (built 1996 for the new moved franchise from the Cleveland Browns to become the new Baltimore Ravens pro football team in the NFL). The time before and during the game was peaceful and fun, but trouble and strife occurred after the final whistle. This was the first documented trouble at the Fall Classic since the early 1970s. With games first being played at old Municipal / Baltimore Stadium, the first built 1923 on 33rd Street's Venable Park. Violence had occasionally occurred near a century before and marred the old City-Poly traditions during the 1920s, but happened elsewhere from the stadium on downtown streets with competing colliding school fans parades. Both governor's and mayor's sons from opposing schools were arrested amid the street riots melees. Four decades later, some more serious strife recurred during the socially tumultuous late 1960s era and early '70s outside old Memorial Stadium (rebuilt 1949–54) on the northside of 33rd Street with huge crowds of over 30,000 fans filling up two-thirds of the bowl. But it had been generally peaceful ever since those times of national unrest with racial summer urban riots and anti-Vietnam War and the military draft protests. Things quieted down specially with the traditions begun first in the 1940s and '50s of a "City – Poly Peace Pact" signing by the two secondary schools student leaders with media coverage at the Mayor's ceremonial office at the historic Baltimore City Hall, and its later renewal in the late '60s.

Now Poly and City still met for the 120th time on November 8, 2008, with guarded anticipation and some added security plus an intensive discussion program at both schools the several weeks before. The Baltimore Polytechnic Institute and The Baltimore City College then met subsequently peacefully again for the 121st time on November 7, 2009, with the score of 26–20. The renewed tradition again continued with Poly"s "Engineers" and City's "Collegians" / "Black Knights" meeting for the 122nd time on November 6, 2010. As of the 2018 game, City had won the prior and trophy in 7 contests.

Because of the extreme large size of the downtown Camden Yards football stadium with two-thirds of the place with empty purple and black Ravens seats empty, the site was changed to the more cozy smaller Hughes Stadium at the Morgan State University in the northeast city but still able to accommodate a larger than usual football crowd, while the Calvert Hall-Loyola game still continued on Thanksgiving Day morning (grabbing all the media attention) moved to the Johnny Unitas Stadium at Towson University north of town and between those two Catholic schools home campuses in Towson.

=== Basketball ===
In February 2020, ESPN ranked the boys basketball team in the top 25 in the country.

== Principals / directors of the B.M.T.S. / B.P.I. ==
- 1st – Dr. Richard Grady (1883–1886)
- 2nd – Lt. John D. Ford, U.S.N. (1886–1890)
- 3rd – Lt. William King, U.S.N. (1890–1921)
- 4th – Dr. Wilmer Dehuff (1921–1958)
- 5th – Claude Burkert (1958–1969)
- 6th – William J. Gerardi (1969–1980)
- 7th – Zeney P. Jacobs (1980–1984)
- 8th – Gary Thrift (1984–1985)
- 9th – John Dohler (1985–1990)
- 10th – Barbara Stricklin ^ (1990–1991)
- 11th – Dr. Albert Strickland (1991–1994)
- 12th – Ian Cohen (1994–2003)
- 13th – Sharon Kanter ^ (2003–2004)
- 14th – Dr. Barney Wilson (2004–2010)
- 15th – Matthew Woolston ^ (2010–2011)
- 16th – Jacqueline Williams (2011–2023)
- 17th – Mark Sawyer (2023–present)

^ Denotes interim director while a search for a permanent director was occurring or ongoing at the time

== Notable alumni ==
=== Arts, literature, and entertainment ===
- H.L. (Henry Louis) Mencken, 1896 – writer/author/reporter/editor/columnist, The Baltimore Morning Herald, The Baltimore Sun (The Sun [morning] and The Evening Sun)
- Stavros Halkias, 2007 – comedian/actor/podcaster
- Jae Deal – Hollywood composer/producer
- William J. Murray – son of atheist Madalyn Murray O'Hair
- Edward Wilson – British writer of spy novels
- Ta-Nehisi Coates – writer
- Dashiell Hammett – writer/author/screenwriter
- Alex Scally, 2000 – guitarist of dream-pop band Beach House

=== Business ===
- Alonzo G. Decker Jr., 1926 – former chairman, Black and Decker Corporation (power tools manufacturer).

=== Education ===
- John Corcoran, PhD, DHC, 1956 – logician, philosopher, mathematician, historian of logic.
- Rev. Joseph Allan Panuska, S.J., 1945 – president of the University of Scranton (1982–1998), academic vice president and dean of faculties at Boston College (1979–1982), provincial of the seven state Maryland Province of the Society of Jesus (1973–1979), a biology professor and director of the Jesuit community at Georgetown University (1963–1973), and Jesuit priest.
- Raynard S. Kington, MD, PhD, president of Grinell College.

=== Government ===
==== Judicial branch ====
- William "Billy" Murphy Jr., Baltimore Circuit Court.

==== Legislative branch ====
- Thomas L. Bromwell, 1967 – (D), Maryland State Senator, District 8, Baltimore County, (1983–2002).
- Andrew J. Burns Jr., 1945 – (D), Maryland State Delegate, District 43, Baltimore (1967–1982).
- Luke Clippinger, 1990 – (D), Maryland State Delegate, District 46, Baltimore (2011–present)
- Cornell Dypski, 1950 – (D), Maryland State Delegate, District 46, Baltimore (1987–2003).
- Edward A. Garmatz – U.S. Representative (Congressman) representing Maryland's 3rd District, (1947–1973).
- Joe Hayes (1988), member of the Alaska House of Representatives (2001–2003).
- A. Wade Kach – 1966 (R) Maryland State Delegate, (1975–2014), Baltimore County Councilman, (2014–present), US Presidential Elector (1972)
- Clarence M. Mitchell, IV – (D), Maryland State Senator, District 39, Baltimore, (1999–2003).
- Nick J. Mosby, 1997 – (D), City Councilman, District 7, Baltimore, (2011–present).
- Charles E. Sydnor III, 1992 – (D), Maryland State Delegate, District 44B, Baltimore County (2015–present)

=== Military ===
- Paul J. Wiedorfer, 1939 – won Medal of Honor at Battle of the Bulge
- Brian W. Cavanaugh, 1986 – lieutenant general, United States Marine Corps

=== Sciences ===
- Don L. Anderson – Geophysicist, winner of the Crafoord Prize and the National Medal of Science
- John Clauser – winner of the 2022 Nobel Prize for Physics
- Scarlin Hernandez – astronautical engineer for NASA’s James Webb Space Telescope
- John Rettaliata – fluid dynamicist, former president at Illinois Institute of Technology
- Robert H. Roy – mechanical engineer, dean of engineering and science at Johns Hopkins University
- Robert Ulanowicz (1961) – noted theoretical ecologist at the University of Maryland Center for Environmental Science's Chesapeake Biological Laboratory

=== Sports ===
- Antonio Freeman, 1990 – former wide receiver for the Green Bay Packers, and Philadelphia Eagles
- Harry L. Lawrence, 1927 – head football coach at The Baltimore City College "Collegians" (1934–1941, 1946) and Bucknell University, Lewisburg, Pennsylvania (1947–1957) "Bisons", Guidance Counselor, Faculty, The Baltimore City College, 1957–1973, also inductee in the B.C.C. Hall of Fame
- Justin Lewis, 2020 – current forward for the Chicago Bulls of the National Basketball Association (NBA)
- Jim Ostendarp – former National Football League (NFL) player and head coach at Amherst College for 33 years from 1959 to 1991
- Mike Pitts, 1978 – played 12 seasons at defensive end for the Atlanta Falcons, Philadelphia Eagles, and New England Patriots, National Football League (NFL)
- Jack Scarbath – former quarterback for the Washington Redskins and Pittsburgh Steelers, National Football League (NFL]), enshrined in College Football Hall of Fame in 1983 for All-American career at University of Maryland at College Park "Terrapins"
- Greg Schaum – former defensive lineman with the Dallas Cowboys and New England Patriots, National Football League (NFL)
- Ricardo Silva, 2006 – former NFL safety
- David Robert "Bob" Fetters, 1939 – multi-sport athlete at the University of Maryland, College Park, 1946 winner of the Schmeisser Award, and World War II veteran
- Jack Turnbull – three-time The Johns Hopkins University "Blue Jays" All-American and 1932 Olympics lacrosse player, 1936 Olympics field hockey player, and World War II fighter pilot
- Justin Wells, 2006 – current guard for the Arena Football League
- LaQuan Williams, 2006 – former wide receiver for the Baltimore Ravens, National Football League (NFL)
- Elmer Wingate – former defensive end for the Baltimore Colts, National Football League (NFL), All-American in both football and lacrosse at the University of Maryland at College Park "Terrapins"

== School songs and hymns ==
- Poly Fight Song
- The Polytechnic Hymn, written by James Sagerholm, Class of 1946 (tune of "The Navy Hymn" / a.k.a. "Eternal Father, Strong to Save"):
