= William N. Sharpe =

American engineering scientist

- Education: Johns Hopkins University (PhD); North Carolina State University (BS and MS)
- Scientific career
- Fields: Mechanics; Fracture Mechanics; MEMS
- Workplaces: Johns Hopkins University

William N. Sharpe Jr. is an American engineer and professor, the Alonzo G. Decker professor of mechanics engineering.

== Education ==
Sharpe earned a B.S. in 1960 and M.S. in 1961 from the North Carolina State University. He received his Ph.D. from the Johns Hopkins University in 1966.

== Research and career ==
After completing his PhD, Sharpe continued on at Johns Hopkins University as the Alonzo G. Decker professor of mechanics engineering and served as department chair from 1983 to 1995. Since retiring he is professor emeritus. He started his research employing optical techniques and particularly laser-based interferometry from his graduate work to interrogate fatigue and elastoplasticity of metals. With the invention of Microelectromechanical systems (MEMS), he applied his method to the in situ measurement of MEMS mechanical properties at relevant length scales. He was active in the Society for Experimental Stress Analysis and later renamed Society for Experimental Mechanics, serving as president from 1984 to 1985. Sharpe was named an Honorary Member of the Society for Experimental Mechanics in 2012. He served as the Editor for the Springer Handbook of Experimental Solid Mechanics. After receiving the Ralph Coats Roe Award of the American Society for Engineering Education in 2007, he initiated the William N. Sharpe Jr. Award for Johns Hopkins University mechanical engineering students demonstrating significant leadership or achievement in extracurricular activities.

== Awards and recognition ==
- Society for Experimental Mechanics Frocht (1966)
- American Society of Mechanical Engineers Fellow (1986)
- Humbolt Fellow (1990)
- Society for Experimental Mechanics Tatnall (1992)
- Society for Experimental Mechanics Fellow (1992)
- American Society of Mechanical Engineers Nadia Medal (1993)
- Society for Experimental Mechanics Lazan (2001)
- SEM Murray Lecture and Award (2002)
- American Society of Engineering Education Ralph Coats Roe Award (2007)
- Society for Experimental Mechanics Honorary Member (2012)
