= Admiral Ford =

Admiral Ford may refer to:

- John Ford (1894–1973), U.S. Navy rear admiral
- John Ford (Royal Navy officer) (died 1796), British Royal Navy vice admiral
- John D. Ford (1840–1918), U.S. Navy rear admiral
- Wilbraham Ford (1880–1964), British Royal Navy vice admiral
