= Paul J. Wiedorfer =

American soldier and recipient of the Medal of honor (1921–2011)

Paul Joseph Wiedorfer
- Born: January 17, 1921; Baltimore, Maryland
- Died: May 25, 2011 (aged 90); Baltimore, Maryland
- Burial place: Moreland Memorial Park Cemetery, Baltimore, Maryland
- Military career
- Allegiance: United States of America
- Branch: United States Army
- Service years: 1943 – 1948
- Rank: Master Sergeant
- Units: 2nd Battalion, 318th Infantry Regiment, 80th Infantry Division
- Wars/Battles: World War II • Battle of the Bulge
- Awards: Medal of Honor; Bronze Star; Purple Heart

Paul Joseph Wiedorfer (January 17, 1921 – May 25, 2011) was a United States Army soldier and a recipient of the United States military's highest decoration, the Medal of Honor, for his actions in World War II.

== Biography ==
Born in Baltimore, Maryland, raised in the 2400 block of McElderry Street, he attended St. Andrew's School, and graduated in 1940 from Baltimore Polytechnic Institute. On November 11, 2008, a plaque honoring him was placed in Poly's Memorial Hall. Wiedorfer joined the United States Army from his birth city in July 1943.

When he joined the Army, he had been married to his bride, Alice Stauffer, for just six months, and working as an apprentice power station operator at the Baltimore Gas & Electric Company in Baltimore, and was living in the 1900 block of Bank Street.

Wiedorfer received basic training at Camp Lee, Virginia. He was then assigned to the Quartermaster Corps, and then passed the examination for cadet air training. He was training to be a pilot, but the Army switched him to infantry because of greater need. On the way to England he crossed the Atlantic Ocean on RMS Queen Mary, and by December 25, 1944, was serving as a private in Company G, 318th Infantry Regiment, 80th Infantry Division.

"So I thought, somebody's got to do something. And all of a sudden I said, 'Goddammit, let's see if we can get that nest.' I remember slipping, falling and the good Lord was with me and I got it. I got two of 'em."

— Paul J. Wiedorfer
On the Medal of Honor suicide charge

On that Christmas Day, near Chaumont, Belgium, Wiedorfer single-handedly charged across 40 yards (37 m) of open ground, destroyed two German machine gun emplacements and took six Germans prisoner. He was subsequently promoted to staff sergeant and on May 29, 1945, issued the Medal of Honor for his actions during the battle.

While crossing the Saar River, he was severely wounded February 10, 1945, by a mortar shell that blew up near him; shrapnel broke his left leg, ripped into his stomach, and seriously injured two fingers on his right hand. The soldier next to him died from his wounds and Paul credited that soldier for saving his life. Recent research has discovered the soldier's name to be PFC Milton C Smithers of Huntingdon, New Jersey. Paul was evacuated to the 137th United States Army General Hospital in England where he was placed in traction. While in the hospital a sergeant reading Stars and Stripes asked him how he spelled his name, and then told him he had received the Medal of Honor. Later, on May 29, 1945, Brigadier General Egmont F. Koenig with a band entered the ward to present him with his medal.

"Wouldn't it be wonderful if the Medal of Honor didn't exist because there were no wars and we could all live in peace? And that the only way to spell war was love? Wouldn't that be wonderful?"

— Paul J. Wiedorfer
On the Medal of Honor

Wiedorfer reached the rank of master sergeant before retiring from the Army. In addition to the Medal of Honor he was also awarded a Bronze Star and two Purple Hearts. He returned to Baltimore on June 11, 1945, and was given a ticker tape parade with General George C. Marshall and Maryland governor Herbert O'Conor in attendance.

After the war he spent another three years recovering in different Army hospitals and then returned to Baltimore Gas & Electric, and retired in 1981 after 40 years of service. He and Alice had four children. Wiedorfer died in Baltimore on May 25, 2011, at age 90. He was buried in Baltimore's Moreland Memorial Park Cemetery on June 7, 2011.

== Medal of Honor citation ==
Wiedorfer's official Medal of Honor citation reads:

He alone made it possible for his company to advance until its objective was seized. Company G had cleared a wooded area of snipers, and 1 platoon was advancing across an open clearing toward another wood when it was met by heavy machinegun fire from 2 German positions dug in at the edge of the second wood. These positions were flanked by enemy riflemen. The platoon took cover behind a small ridge approximately 40 yards from the enemy position. There was no other available protection and the entire platoon was pinned down by the German fire. It was about noon and the day was clear, but the terrain extremely difficult due to a 3-inch snowfall the night before over ice-covered ground. Pvt. Wiedorfer, realizing that the platoon advance could not continue until the 2 enemy machinegun nests were destroyed, voluntarily charged alone across the slippery open ground with no protecting cover of any kind. Running in a crouched position, under a hail of enemy fire, he slipped and fell in the snow, but quickly rose and continued forward with the enemy concentrating automatic and small-arms fire on him as he advanced. Miraculously escaping injury, Pvt. Wiedorfer reached a point some 10 yards from the first machinegun emplacement and hurled a handgrenade into it. With his rifle he killed the remaining Germans, and, without hesitation, wheeled to the right and attacked the second emplacement. One of the enemy was wounded by his fire and the other 6 immediately surrendered. This heroic action by 1 man enabled the platoon to advance from behind its protecting ridge and continue successfully to reach its objective. A few minutes later, when both the platoon leader and the platoon sergeant were wounded, Pvt. Wiedorfer assumed command of the platoon, leading it forward with inspired energy until the mission was accomplished.

== See also ==
- List of Medal of Honor recipients for World War II
