= Joe L. Hayes Jr. =

American politician (born 1970)

Member of the Alaska House of Representatives from the 30th district
- In office January 2001 – January 2003
- Preceded by: Tom Brice
- Succeeded by: redistricting

Personal details
- Born: May 1, 1970 (age 56) New York City
- Party: Democratic
- Education: University of Alaska Fairbanks B.A., Political Science
- Occupation: Consultant

Joe L. Hayes Jr. (born May 1, 1970) is an American businessman and politician. From Fairbanks, Alaska, he was elected to the Alaska House of Representatives in November 2000. He was the only African American in the Alaska House during his term. A distinguished alumnus of the University of Alaska Fairbanks (B.A. 1997), he was elected student body president and as a student appointed by the Alaska Governor to the Statewide University of Alaska board of regents. Hayes worked for a decade as executive director of the UAF Alumni Association.

== Early life ==
Born Joe L. Hayes Jr. to Brenda Ann Lee, a nurse assistant in Manhattan, New York, he was raised in Baltimore, Maryland, with nine other siblings without a father in the home. Hayes graduated from Baltimore Polytechnic Institute in 1988.

== Public service ==
Hayes enlisted in the United States Air Force after high school graduation. During his four years of service, Hayes advanced to the E-4 (rank) of sergeant, earning the Commendation Medal, Good Conduct Medal and the National Defense Service Medal. His first and last duty station was Eielson Air Force Base near Fairbanks, Alaska.

After his honorable discharge Hayes enrolled in the Political Science concentration of the University of Alaska Fairbanks (UAF) in 1992, receiving his bachelor's degree in 1997. His student service included seats on the Sun Star publication board, KSUA media board, budget council, and the governance coordinating committee. He was elected to the office of a student body senator, receiving the Senator of the Year award in 1994. In 1995, he was elected UAF's first Black student body president, serving two terms. Hayes was on the 1994 dean's list. He was the recipient of the 1995 Blue and Gold Award and was inducted into the National Political Science Honor Society, Pi Sigma Alpha.

From 1995–97, Hayes was the first African American on the University of Alaska board of regents. Appointed by Gov. Tony Knowles, he served as the student regent. The UA regents' seat for a current student began in 1973. Student Regents are appointed by the Governor and confirmed by the Alaska Legislature after first being elected by students for nomination from his/her campus. Student regents serve a two-year term.

Joe L. Hayes Jr. is not related to James C. Hayes, the former mayor of Fairbanks Alaska.

== Legislative service ==
After graduation from UAF Hayes worked as a legislative aide, then as chief of staff for Rep. Tom Brice(D) of the then College, Alaska/Fairbanks House 30th District before winning that seat vacated by Brice when he decided not to run again. In 2000 Joe Hayes ran as a Democrat, winning 62.06 percent of the vote against write-in candidates.

In Alaska write-in campaigns are not taken lightly. Incumbent Lisa Murkowski lost the Republican Party primary nomination for Alaska U.S. Senator. Still, Murkowski ran as a write-in candidate, defeating both the Republican and Democrat on the ballot in the 2010 General Election, with 39.5 percent of the vote.

Hayes served as a member of the 22nd legislature in the Alaska House of Representatives, on the Labor and Commerce, State Affairs Committees, the Special Committees for Military and Veterans Affairs and the Administrative Review Committee. Redistricting from the year 2000 moved most of the voters of House District 30 into the new Denali/University District 8 and Fairbanks District 9. In Nov. 2002, the new Denali/University 8th District had Democrat David Guttenberg running and winning. While Hayes ran for election as a Democrat in the new Fairbanks House District 9. Hayes lost the House District 9 race to Republican Jim Holm who received 52.16 percent of the votes. Joe Hayes returned to UAF as its new Alumni Director working enthusiastically for more than ten years. Hayes became an advisor to the UAF Nu Omega chapter of Alpha Phi Omega. He resigned from the director position in Feb. 2014.

His firm The Hayes Group, LLC provides consultation to non-profit organizations.

== Accolades ==
- September 26, 1997 The Board of Regents recognizes the dedicated service of Joe L. Hayes Jr., and extends to him this official statement of appreciation for his contributions to the University of Alaska and the advancement of higher education in Alaska. See
- At the 1997 UAF graduation, Hayes received the Joel Wiegert Award (as the Outstanding Graduating Senior Man.)
- The 2004 UAF Distinguished Alumnus Award winner was, Joe Hayes
