= USS John D. Ford =

Clemson-class destroyer

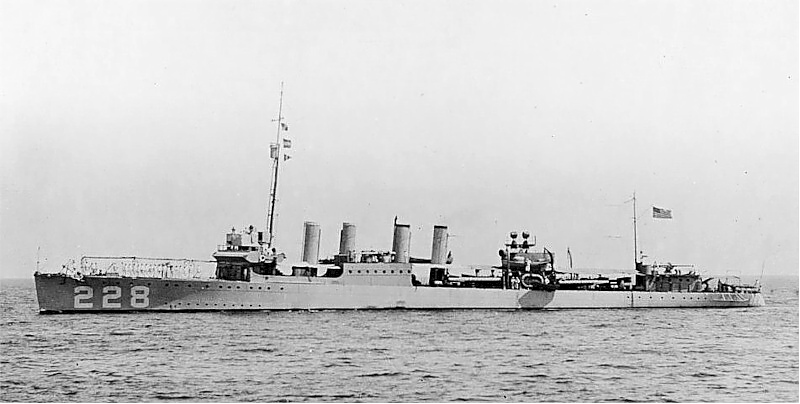
- USS John D. Ford (DD-228) 1930

History

United States
- Namesake: John Donaldson Ford
- Builder: William Cramp & Sons, Philadelphia
- Yard number: 494
- Laid down: 11 November 1919
- Launched: 2 September 1920
- Sponsored by: F. Faith Ford
- Commissioned: 30 December 1920
- Decommissioned: 2 November 1945
- Stricken: 16 November 1945
- Honours and awards: John D Ford received a Presidential Unit Citation (specifically honoring her "extraordinary heroism in action during the Java Campaign, 23 January - 2 March 1942) and four battle stars for her World War II service
- Fate: Sold for scrap, 5 October 1947

General characteristics
- Class & type: Clemson-class destroyer
- Displacement: 1,190 tons
- Length: 314 feet 5 inches (95.83 m)
- Beam: 31 feet 9 inches (9.68 m)
- Draft: 9 feet 3 inches (2.82 m)
- Propulsion: 26,500 shp (20 W); geared turbines, 2 screws
- Speed: 35 knots (65 km/h)
- Complement: 101 officers and enlisted
- Armament: 4 x 4 in (102 mm) guns, 1 x 3 in (76 mm) AA, 2 x .30 (7.62 mm) cal MG., 12 x 21 inch (533 mm) torpedo tubes.

USS John D. Ford (DD-228/AG-119) was a Clemson-class destroyer in the United States Navy during World War II. She was named for Rear Admiral John Donaldson Ford.

John D. Ford was laid down 11 November 1919 and launched 2 September 1920 from William Cramp & Sons; sponsored by Miss F. Faith Ford, daughter of Rear Admiral Ford; and commissioned as Ford 30 December 1920.

== Service history ==
After acceptance trials off New England, John D. Ford received Lieutenant Commander C. A. Pownall as commanding officer 16 July 1921. On 17 November, while operating along the eastern seaboard, her name was changed to John D. Ford. After training in the Caribbean, she departed Newport, Rhode Island, 20 June 1922 for permanent duty with the Asiatic Fleet. Sailing via the Mediterranean Sea, the Suez Canal, and the Indian Ocean, she arrived Cavite, Manila Bay, 21 August to begin almost two decades of service in the Far East.

Prior to the outbreak of World War II, Ford operated out of Manila, cruising Asiatic waters from southern China to northern Japan. During April and May 1924, she helped establish temporary air bases on the Japanese Kurile and Hokkaidō Islands in support of the pioneer, global flight between 9 April and 28 September by the United States Army Air Service.

=== Chinese Civil War ===
On 6 June she deployed to Shanghai, China, to protect American lives and interests, which were threatened by Chinese civil strife. After renewal of the Chinese Civil War in May 1926, she patrolled the Chinese coast to protect convoys from roving bands of bandits. On 24 March 1927 she supported the evacuation of American and foreign nationals, who were fleeing from mob violence at Nanjing. That event included a naval bombardment of the city.

The ascendancy of the reformed Nationalist government under Chiang Kai-shek in 1928 reduced the intensity of the civil strife. However, Sino-Japanese relations deteriorated, requiring Ford to remain in China. Following Japanese aggression in northern China during July 1937, she evacuated Americans from Beiping as Japanese ships prepared to blockade the Chinese coast. Steaming to Manila 21 November, she operated between the Philippines and southern China on fleet maneuvers. After war broke out in Europe in September 1939, she increased training off the Philippines and commenced Neutrality patrols in the Philippine and South China Seas.

=== World War II ===
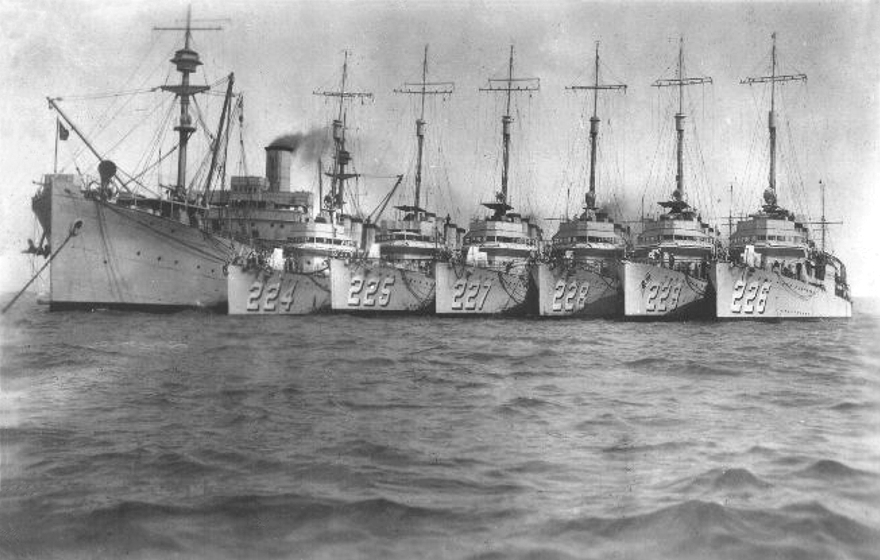
Left to right: Destroyer tender USS Whitney (AD-4) and destroyers USS Stewart (DD-224), USS Pope (DD-225), USS Pillsbury (DD-227), USS John D. Ford (DD-228), USS Truxtun (DD-229), and USS Peary (DD-226).

After the Japanese attack on Pearl Harbor 7 December 1941, John D. Ford readied for action at Cavite as a unit of DesDiv 59. Undamaged by the destructive Japanese air raid on Manila Bay 10 December, she sailed southward the same day to patrol the Sulu Sea and Makassar Strait with Task Force 6. She remained in Makassar Strait until 23 December, then she steamed from Balikpapan, Borneo, to Surabaya, Java, arriving the 24th.

As the Japanese pressed southward through the Philippines and into Indonesia, the Allies could hardly hope to contain the Japanese offensive in the East Indies. With too few ships and practically no air support they strove to harass the Japanese forces in an attempt to delay their advance, and to prevent the invasion of Australia. Anxious to strike back at the Japanese, Ford departed Surabaya 11 January 1942 for Kupang, Timor, where she arrived on the 18th to join a destroyer striking force. Two days later the force sailed for Balikpapan to conduct a surprise torpedo attack on Japanese shipping. Arriving off Balikpapan during mid watch 24 January, the four destroyers launched a raid through the Japanese transports while Japanese destroyers steamed about Makassar Strait in search of reported American submarines. For over an hour the destroyers fired torpedoes and shells at the astonished enemy. Before retiring from the first surface action in the Pacific war, they sank four Japanese ships; one of them, the IJA transport Tsuruga Maru, fell victim to John D. Ford's torpedoes and was lost along with six crewmen and 272 troops. The striking force arrived Surabaya 25 January.

The Japanese pincer offensive through the Dutch East Indies continued despite Allied harassment. On 3 February the Japanese began air raids on Surabaya, and John D. Ford retired in convoy to Tjilatjap on the southern coast of Java. During mid-February the Japanese tightened their control of islands east and west of Java, and on 18 February they landed troops on Bali, adjacent to the eastern end of the Java. In response John D. Ford, Pope, and other American and Dutch ships steamed to Badoeng Strait in two waves to engage an enemy destroyer-transport force during the night of 19/20 February in what became known as the Battle of Badung Strait. A unit of the first wave, Ford conducted a running engagement with two Japanese destroyers without results. The outcome from the battle as a whole was a Japanese victory: the landings on Bali were successful and the Dutch destroyer HNLMS Piet Hein was sunk, while suffering substantial damage to only one ship.

Returning to Tjilatjap 21 February for fuel, Ford and Pope immediately sailed to Christmas Island to pick up the last reserve of 17 to 18 torpedoes from Black Hawk. Then they steamed to Surabaya, arriving on the 24th to join the dwindling ABDA Striking Force. Hampered by shortages of fuel, ammunition, and torpedoes and reduced in strength by sinkings, battle damage, and repair needs, the Allies indeed faced a "critical situation." Only four U.S. destroyers remained operational in the Striking Force.

Late on the 25th, Ford sortied with the Striking Force from Surabaya in search of a large enemy amphibious force in the Java Sea. Returning to port the following day, the force was joined by five British ships; once more the Striking Force steamed to intercept the enemy. Following an unsuccessful strike by enemy planes the morning of the 27th, the Allied force steamed for Surabaya. While steaming through the mine field, the ships reversed course and deployed to meet the enemy off the northern coast of Java.

The Battle of Java Sea commenced at 1616 and continued for over 7 hours. The Allied ships, 5 cruisers and 9 destroyers, engaged the enemy force, four cruisers and 13 destroyers, in a furious running battle marked by intermittent gun and torpedo duels. Ford emerged from the battle undamaged, but once again the battle as whole was a defeat for the Allies, as in the unsuccessful attempt to prevent the invasion of Java five Allied ships were sunk.

Retiring to Surabaya, Ford and three other destroyers of DesDiv 58 departed after dark 28 February for Australia. Steaming undetected through the narrows of Bali Strait during midwatch 1 March, the destroyers encountered three Japanese destroyers guarding the southern end of the strait. Out of torpedoes and low on ammunition, the destroyers retreated from the Japanese patrol and steamed for Fremantle. Lieutenant Commander J. E. Cooper, who had skippered Ford since before the outbreak of the war, brought her safely to Australia 4 March.

After two months of convoy escort duty along the Australian coast, Ford departed Brisbane 9 May for Pearl Harbor. Arriving 2 June, she sailed in convoy three days later for San Francisco and arrived 12 June. She cleared San Francisco for Pearl Harbor 23 June, and during the next 11 months escorted nine convoys between San Francisco and Pearl. Returning to the West Coast 20 May 1943, she departed San Francisco 24 May for convoy and antisubmarine warfare (ASW) patrols in the Atlantic.

Assigned to the 10th Fleet, Ford transited the Panama Canal 4 June and joined a Trinidad-bound convoy the 6th. For the next 6 months she ranged the North and South Atlantic from New York and Charleston, South Carolina, to Casablanca, French Morocco, and Recife, Brazil, protecting supply convoys from U-boats. After ASW training late in December, she joined Guadalcanal out of Norfolk, Virginia 5 January 1944 for offensive ASW operations in the Atlantic. The destroyer supported the destruction of German submarine U-544 by planes from Guadalcanal, who surprised and depth charged the submarine while refueling west of the Azores 16 January.

After returning to the East Coast 16 February, Ford cleared Norfolk 14 March for a convoy run to the Mediterranean. While at Gibraltar 29 March, she was damaged in a collision with a British tanker. Following repairs, she returned to Norfolk, arriving 1 May. Departing Norfolk 24 May for convoy duty to the Canal Zone, Ford continued convoy patrols for almost a year from eastern seaboard ports to Recife, Reykjavík, and Casablanca.

From 24 May 1945 to 27 June, she acted as escort and plane guard for Boxer during the carrier's shakedown in the Caribbean, then she returned to Norfolk. She sailed 8 July for Boston Navy Yard where she arrived 9 July for conversion to miscellaneous auxiliary AG-119. After conversion, she returned to Norfolk 9 September and decommissioned 2 November 1945. Subsequently, she was sold for scrap 5 October 1947 to Northern Metal Company, Philadelphia.

== Awards ==
- Presidential Unit Citation (23 January - 2 March 1942)
- American Defense Service Medal with "FLEET" clasp
- Asiatic-Pacific Campaign Medal with two battle stars
- American Campaign Medal
- European-African-Middle Eastern Campaign Medal with one battle star
- World War II Victory Medal

=== Presidential Unit Citation ===
For extraordinary heroism in action against enemy Japanese forces during the Java Campaign in the Southwest Pacific War Area, from 23 January to 4 March 1942. Gallantly operating in defense of the Netherlands East Indies with the limited surface forces of the combined United States, British and Dutch Royal Navies, the JOHN D. FORD led a column of four destroyers in a fierce night counter-invasion action off Balikpapan, confusing and disorganizing the enemy to aid in the sinking or damaging by torpedo and gunfire of a number of Japanese warships. A highly vulnerable target for hostile cruiser and destroyer gunfire while fighting as a unit of a joint United States-Dutch Striking Force in the Badoeng Strait action, she responded nobly to the heroic efforts of her officers and men and scored several damaging torpedo and gun hits before affecting a masterly withdrawal from the field of combat. Boldly attacking a numerically superior force by day in the Java Sea action, she was one of six vessels in the combined United States-Dutch-British Combined Striking Force to wage a brilliant torpedo attack against the main body of the Japanese Armada and, hurling the full fighting power of her gun batteries at the hostile disposition, exerted every means at her command to inflict damage on the Japanese and aid her companion ships in forcing the enemy to break off the engagement. Relentlessly trailed by cruiser-borne planes and repeatedly bombed by enemy aircraft, she battled with unconquerable spirit and undiminished fury against strong dispositions vastly superior in numbers and armament during this early critical period of the war. The JOHN D. FORD’S illustrious achievements add new luster to the annals of American Naval Warfare and uphold the highest traditions of the United States Naval Service.

As of 2010, no other U.S. Navy ship has been named John D. Ford.
