= Edward Wilson (novelist) =

British novelist

- Website: www.edwardwilson.info

Edward Wilson is a British writer of spy fiction. A native of Baltimore, Maryland, United States, he immigrated to the United Kingdom after serving in the Vietnam War, renounced his US citizenship to naturalise in his new country, and after three decades as a teacher chose to quit to devote himself full-time to his career as a novelist. He has written eight novels, all published by Arcadia Books.

== Personal life ==
Wilson was born in Baltimore, Maryland. His Anglo-Indian-descended father, a merchant sailor, died when Edward was six months old, leaving Edward's mother to raise him and his two brothers. He did his secondary education at the Baltimore Polytechnic Institute before going on to the University of Virginia on a Reserve Officers' Training Corps scholarship. He was shipped off to the Vietnam War in the aftermath of the 1968 Tet Offensive as an officer in the 5th Special Forces and the experience sharpened his opposition to the foreign policy of the United States. For his actions in the war he was decorated with the Bronze Star Medal and the Army Commendation Medal for Valor.

After the war, Wilson travelled in Canada and later spent time in Bremen, West Germany as a labourer in a shipyard and a nursing assistant in a hospital. In 1976 he settled in Suffolk, England, where he worked as a teacher for three decades. He naturalised as a British citizen in 1983 and renounced his US citizenship.

Politically, Wilson is a member of the Labour Party and a supporter of trade unions.

== Works ==
=== Portrait of The Spy as a Young Man ===
The latest novel in the Catesby series by Edward Wilson, published in 2020.

In 1941, a teenage William Catesby left Cambridge to join the army and support the war effort. Parachuted into Occupied France as an SOE officer, he witnesses tragedies and remarkable feats of bravery during the French Resistance. And in 2014, Catesby recounted his life to his granddaughter for the first time when he was in his nineties.

=== A River in May ===
Wilson's debut novel A River in May, published in 2002, was based on his experiences in the Vietnam War. As he stated, the book "expelled my battlefield demons". It was shortlisted for the Commonwealth Writers' Prize.

=== The Envoy ===
The Envoy is set in Britain in the 1950s, and discusses an American plot to sabotage USSR–UK relations. Its protagonist is Kit Fournier, the Central Intelligence Agency station chief at the Embassy of the United States, London. It was the first book in what was originally intended to be a trilogy of spy novels, but later had a fourth book added to it with the publication of The Whitehall Mandarin. The book introduces characters who would go on to play a larger role in Wilson's later novels, including William Catesby [no sign of this character in the Kindle version of The Envoy], a native of a Suffolk fishing village who fits in poorly with either his old neighbours or his government colleagues, and his boss Henry Bone. A running joke in the series describes how Catesby's alleged ancestor Robert Catesby planned the Gunpowder Plot of 1605.

=== The Darkling Spy ===
In Wilson's 2011 novel The Darkling Spy, the year is 1956, and Catesby is serving under official cover at the British Embassy in Bonn. Kit Fournier from The Envoy appears again, but in this book he has fallen in love with an English woman who serves as a spy for Moscow, and is considering defection.

=== The Midnight Swimmer ===
The Midnight Swimmer, published in 2012, is set against the build-up to the Cuban Missile Crisis of 1962.

=== The Whitehall Mandarin ===
The Whitehall Mandarin, was published in May 2014. The launch was held at Hatchards bookshop in London. The title is a reference both to bureaucrats and to China, and the question of how China was able to develop thermonuclear weapons so quickly plays a role in the novel.

=== A Very British Ending ===
A Very British Ending was published on 14 April 2016. It takes Catesby's story into the 1970s.

=== South Atlantic Requiem ===
South Atlantic Requiem was published on 15 March 2018, bringing Catesby's story into the era of the Falklands War of 1982. It was included in a round-up of the best Summer Books 2018 by writer Sunny Singh in The Guardian
