= Andrew J. Burns Jr. =

American politician (1927–2010)

Member of the Maryland House of Delegates from the 43rd district
- In office 1966–1982 Serving with Henry R. Hergenroeder Jr., John F. X. O'Brien, Joseph William Lanasa, John A. Pica Jr.

Personal details
- Born: Andrew Joseph Burns Jr. July 25, 1927 Baltimore, Maryland, U.S.
- Died: November 12, 2010 (aged 83) Baltimore, Maryland, U.S.
- Party: Democratic
- Spouse: Shirley Nina Taylor (divorced)
- Children: 6
- Education: Polytechnic Institute; Loyola College; University of Maryland School of Law
- Profession: lawyer, politician

Andrew Joseph Burns Jr. (July 25, 1927 – November 12, 2010) was a member of the Maryland House of Delegates, representing District 43.

== Early life ==
Andrew Joseph Burns Jr. was born into a prominent political family whose father, Andrew J. Burns, was said to be a major player in the Democratic Party in Baltimore. His grandfather, Andrew J. Burns, was also active in the Democratic Party in Baltimore.

Burns graduated from Polytechnic Institute in 1945 and soon enlisted in the United States Navy. After serving in the military, Burns earned his bachelor's degree from Loyola College in 1950. Burns later attended and graduated from the University of Maryland School of Law.

== Career ==
Burns served in the military twice, once after high school right at the end of World War II, and again during the Korean War. While in the Navy, Burns served on the USS Washburn (AKA-108), USS Putnam (DD-757), and USS Theodore E. Chandler (DD-717). He was discharged as a lieutenant and remained active in the United States Navy Reserve.

After college, Burns briefly worked in real estate before he began practicing law in 1960. He continued practicing law at a Harford Road office in Hamilton until retiring in 1995.

Burns was first elected to the Maryland House of Delegates in 1966 and served until 1983, having lost in the primary in 1982. While in office, Burns served on the Judiciary and Baltimore Convention Center committees and chaired the Civil Laws Committee. He later ran twice unsuccessfully for a seat on the Baltimore City Council, in 1983 and 1987.

== Personal life ==
Burns married and later divorced Shirley Nina Taylor. He had six sons.
