= MEMS for in situ mechanical characterization =

MEMS that measure mechanical properties of nanoscale objects

MEMS for in situ mechanical characterization refers to microelectromechanical systems (MEMS) used to measure the mechanical properties (such as the Young's modulus and fracture strength) of nanoscale specimens such as nanowires, nanorods, whiskers, nanotubes and thin films. They distinguish themselves from other methods of nanomechanical testing because the sensing and actuation mechanisms are embedded and/or co-fabricated in the microsystem, providing—in the majority of cases—greater sensitivity and precision.

This level of integration and miniaturization allows carrying out the mechanical characterization in situ, i.e., testing while observing the evolution of the sample in high magnification instruments such as optical microscopes, scanning electron microscopes (SEM), transmission electron microscopes (TEM) and X-ray setups. Furthermore, analytical capabilities of these instruments such as spectroscopy and diffraction can be used to further characterize the sample, providing a complete picture of the evolution of the specimen as it is loaded and fails. Owing to the development of mature MEMS microfabrication technologies, the use of these microsystems for research purposes has been increasing in recent years.

Most of the current developments aim to implement in situ mechanical testing coupled with another type of measurements, such as electrical or thermal, and to extend the range of samples tested to the biological domain, testing specimens such as cells and collagen fibrils.

== Mechanical characterization at the nanoscale ==
Typical macroscale mechanical characterization is mostly performed under uniaxial tensile conditions. Despite the existence of other methods of mechanical characterization such as three-point bending, hardness testing, etc., uniaxial tensile testing allows for the measurement of the most fundamental mechanical measurement of the specimen, namely its stress-strain curve. From this curve, important properties like the Young's modulus, Yield strength, Fracture Strength can be computed. Other properties such as toughness and ductility can be computed as well.

At the nanoscale, owing to the reduced size of the specimen and the forces and displacements to be measured, uniaxial testing or any mechanical testing for that matter, are challenging. As a result, most tests are carried in configurations other than uniaxial-tensile, using available nanoscale science tools like the atomic force microscope (AFM) to perform a three-point bending test, SEM and TEM to perform bending resonance tests and nanoindenters to perform compression tests. In recent years, it has been found that results are not completely unambiguous. This was exemplified by the fact that different researchers obtained different values of the same property for the same material. This spurred the development of MEMS with the capability of carrying out tensile tests on individual nanoscale elements.

== Historical context and state of the art ==
The interest in nanomechanical testing was initially spurred by a need to characterize the materials that were used in the fabrication of MEMS. William N. Sharpe at Johns Hopkins University conducted pioneering work in the testing of microscale specimen of polycrystalline silicon. Some of the initial developments consisted mostly of miniaturized versions of universal testing machines, which were fabricated by standard machining techniques. However, important contributions and insights were provided into specimen gripping mechanisms and the mechanics of materials at the micron scale. Likewise, Horacio D. Espinosa at Northwestern University developed a membrane deflection experiment, which was employed at the MEMS level as well as in thin film specimens. The latest revealed the first experimental evidence of size scale plasticity in thin metallic freestanding films. Later, size effect studies were performed on single crystal pillars using nanoindentation of microfabricated samples by means of focused ion beam.

Later on, Taher Saif at University of Illinois- Urbana Champaign can be credited on developing microfabricated stages. Several results in situ SEM and TEM were demonstrated for thin films by his group including a stage for simultaneous electrical and mechanical testing, although this set-up used external actuation and sensing. A major breakthrough in MEMS-electronic integration was made by Horacio D. Espinosa and his group at Northwestern University. They designed and developed a true MEM system that incorporated capacitive sensing for electronic measurement of load and thermal actuation for specimen straining in one single chip. The system could be operated inside a transmission electron microscope. The MEMS based platform was applied to the study of poly-Silicon samples, multi-walled CNTs and more recently metallic and semiconducting nanowires. In particular, the theoretical strength of carbon nanotubes was experimentally measured for the first time using this device.

Schematic of the MEMS for in situ tensile testing of nanostructures

Following these pioneering works, other research groups have followed on developing their own MEMS for mechanical testing. Important examples include the deBoer group at Sandia National Labs who specializes in the testing of polysilicon samples. At the Ecole Polythecnique Federale de Lausanne (EPFL), an electrostatically actuated device, similar to Espinosa's original design, was developed in Silicon-On-Insulator technology by the Michler's group. These devices have the advantage of a higher aspect ratio and therefore a higher sensitivity in the sensing structures. Some other researchers have developed other devices following the models outlines by Espinosa, Saif and Haque; For example Victor Bright at University of Colorado – Boulder. The technology has reached a level of maturity such that standard devices are now offered by the Center for Integrated Nanotechnologies (CINT) at Sandia National Labs to researchers interested in mechanical testing of nanoscale samples.

== Future directions ==
Several nanomechanical characterization methods have yielded many results for properties of matter at the nanoscale. What has been found consistently is that mechanical properties of materials change as a function of size. In metals, elastic modulus, yield strength and fracture strength all increase, while in semiconducting brittle materials, either increments or reductions are observed depending on the material.

The discovery that mechanical properties are intrinsically size-dependent has spurred theoretical and experimental interest in the size-dependence of other material properties, such as thermal and electrical; and also coupled effects like electromechanical or thermomechanical behavior. Particular interest has been focused on characterizing electromechanical properties such as piezoresistivity and piezoelectricity. Most of the current focus in the developing of MEMS for in situ testing lies in this area with examples from Haque, Espinosa and Zhang.

On the other hand, given that MEMS has demonstrated to be a feasible technology for characterizing mechanical properties at the nanoscale, application of the technology to other types of problems has been sought. In particular, biological systems spur an interest because understanding mechanics in biological systems finds application in disease diagnosis and treatment, and in the engineering of new materials. The size scales in biological testing are in the micron range, with structures that are typically very compliant. This requires the development of devices with high displacement capabilities and very high force resolution. Recent examples are the tensile characterization of collagen fibrils and DNA bundles.

== See also ==
- Lab-on-a-chip
