= Camden Yards Sports Complex =

Sports facility in Baltimore, Maryland, U.S.

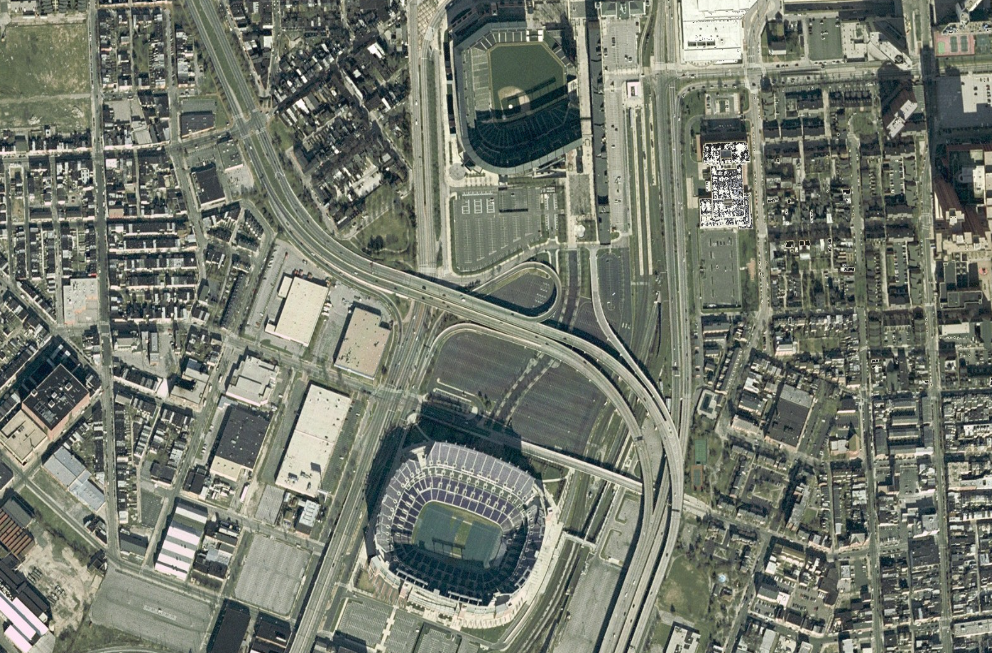
- Aerial view, with Oriole Park at top and M&T Bank Stadium at bottom
- Interactive map of Camden Yards Sports Complex
- Location: Baltimore, Maryland, United States
- Coordinates: 39.281°N 76.621°W
- Owner: Maryland Stadium Authority
- Facilities: Oriole Park at Camden Yards; M&T Bank Stadium

Construction
- Architect: HOK Sport (now Populous)

Tenants
- Baltimore Ravens (NFL); Baltimore Orioles (MLB)

The Camden Yards Sports Complex is an 85-acre (34 ha) sports and entertainment campus located in the center of Baltimore, Maryland, owned and operated by the Maryland Stadium Authority. The complex is composed of multiple buildings and stadiums, including Oriole Park at Camden Yards and M&T Bank Stadium. The two stadiums are home to the Baltimore Orioles of Major League Baseball and the Baltimore Ravens of the National Football League, respectively. The Babe Ruth Birthplace and Museum is located approximately two blocks from the main entrance of Camden Yards at Eutaw Street. The complex also features the original Camden Station, which formerly housed the Sports Legends Museum at Camden Yards and Geppi's Entertainment Museum. In addition to the sports facilities, it is also a location for community events such as the Dew Tour's Panasonic Open in June 2007 and 2008, the Baltimore Marathon, and the African American Festival, which is held every year.

== Etymology ==
The complex and its surrounding district take their name from the former Baltimore and Ohio Railroad (B&O) rail yards and the adjacent Camden Station, which occupied the site beginning in the 1850s. The station and yards were in turn named for nearby Camden Street, which appears on a 1792 map of Baltimore and was named in honor of Charles Pratt, 1st Earl Camden, an 18th-century British Lord Chancellor noted for his sympathy toward the American colonial cause. When the Maryland Stadium Authority redeveloped the site in the late 1980s and early 1990s, Governor William Donald Schaefer advocated for the "Camden Yards" name in reference to the former rail terminal; the resulting name of the ballpark, Oriole Park at Camden Yards, represented a compromise between the state and the Orioles, who had favored simply "Oriole Park."

== Camden Station ==
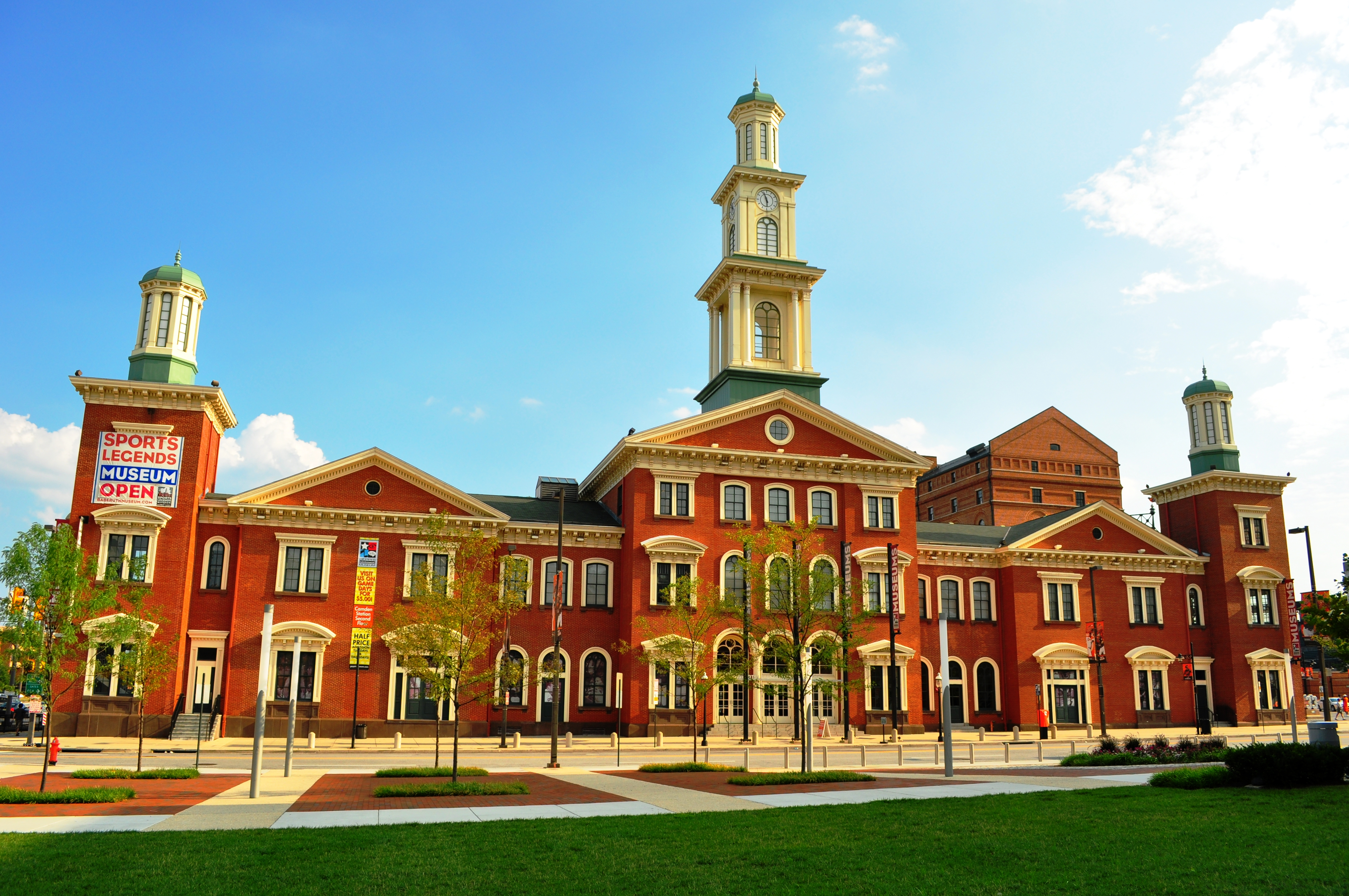
Camden Station in 2010

The original Camden Station was a stop on the B&O Railroad. Constructed between 1856 and 1857, this railroad stop served both passenger and freight trains. President Abraham Lincoln traveled through Camden Station on his way to his inauguration. His body traveled through the station when his funeral train made its first stop in Baltimore.

Since being closed in the 1980s, the Sports Legends Museum occupied the space starting in 2005, with the hopes of maintaining and commemorating the historic significance of Maryland's past and present sports teams; the Maryland Stadium Authority completed a renovation of the building's roughly 45,000-square-foot (4,200 m^{2}) interior that same year, restoring its lobby and waiting room to their 1850s appearance. The museum was privately owned by the Babe Ruth Birthplace Foundation until its closure on October 12, 2015. The Sports Legends Museum sought a new location in Baltimore in order to preserve the history and legacy of Babe Ruth, the Baltimore Orioles, Ravens, and Colts, as well as local and regional sports at the amateur, collegiate and professional levels. The museum's collection was valued at over $3.2 million in sports memorabilia. The later tenant in Camden Station was Geppi's Entertainment Museum, which closed on June 3, 2018. Camden Station was subsequently left vacant.

== M&T Bank Stadium ==
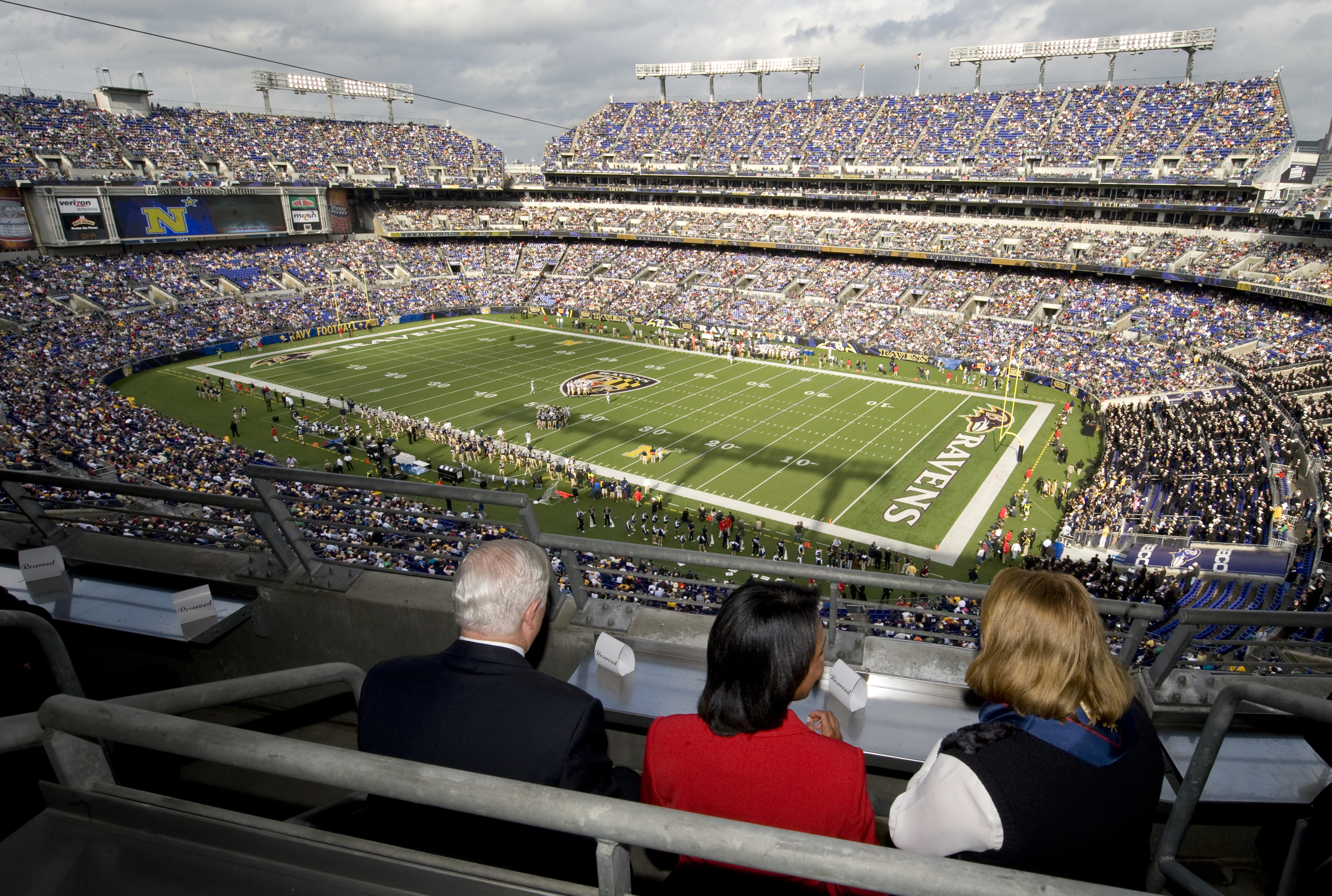
M&T Bank Stadium during the 2008 Notre Dame versus Navy Game

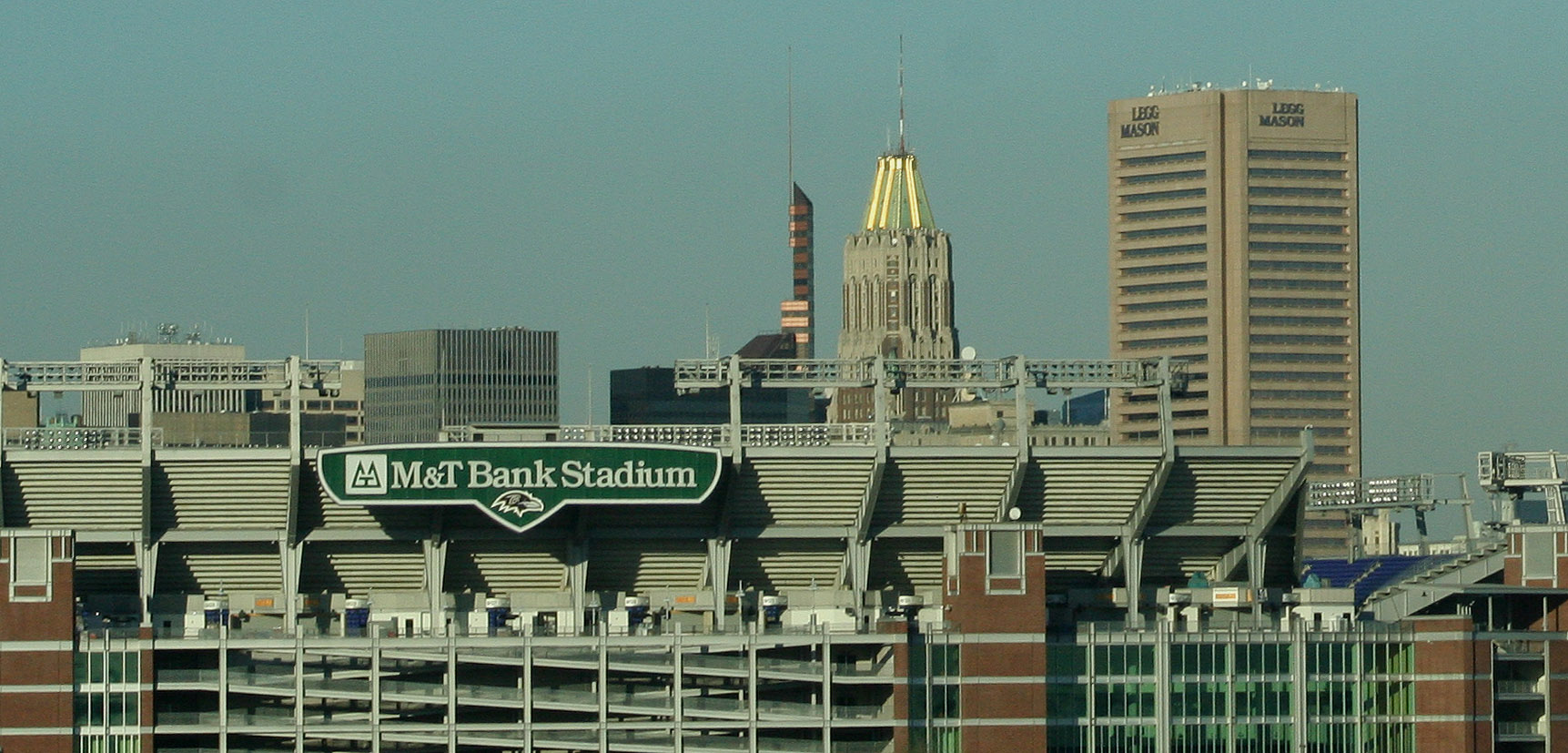
M&T Bank Stadium and Baltimore skyline

M&T Bank Stadium is home to the Baltimore Ravens football franchise located at 1101 Russell Street. The Ravens franchise returned the NFL to Baltimore in 1996 when the Cleveland Browns announced their intention to move. The stadium was completed in 1998 at an estimated cost of $220 million, opening on September 6, 1998. The venue was originally known as PSINet Stadium and was called Ravens Stadium at Camden Yards from February 28, 2002, before being renamed M&T Bank Stadium on May 6, 2003. The stadium itself is 185 ft. high. It hosts numerous concerts and sporting events like the NCAA Men's Lacrosse Championship (2003, 2004, 2007, 2010, 2011, 2014), a Tottenham vs. Liverpool friendly (2012), the CONCACAF Gold Cup Quarterfinals (2013, 2015), U2 (2011), Jay-Z (2013, 2014), and Billy Joel (2015). The stadium is also LEED (Leadership in Energy and Environmental Design) Certified, being the first existing outdoor professional sports facility in the United States to do so. The stadium offers scenic views of the Baltimore city skyline. There are 71,008 available seats, much more than its sister ballpark, Oriole Park. There are also 8,196 club seats located in 128 different suites. Each suite holds between 20 and 24 people and offers VIP parking, access to club lounges, fully staffed bars, concierge services, private restrooms, personal wait staff, and scenic views of downtown Baltimore.

== Babe Ruth Birthplace and Museum ==
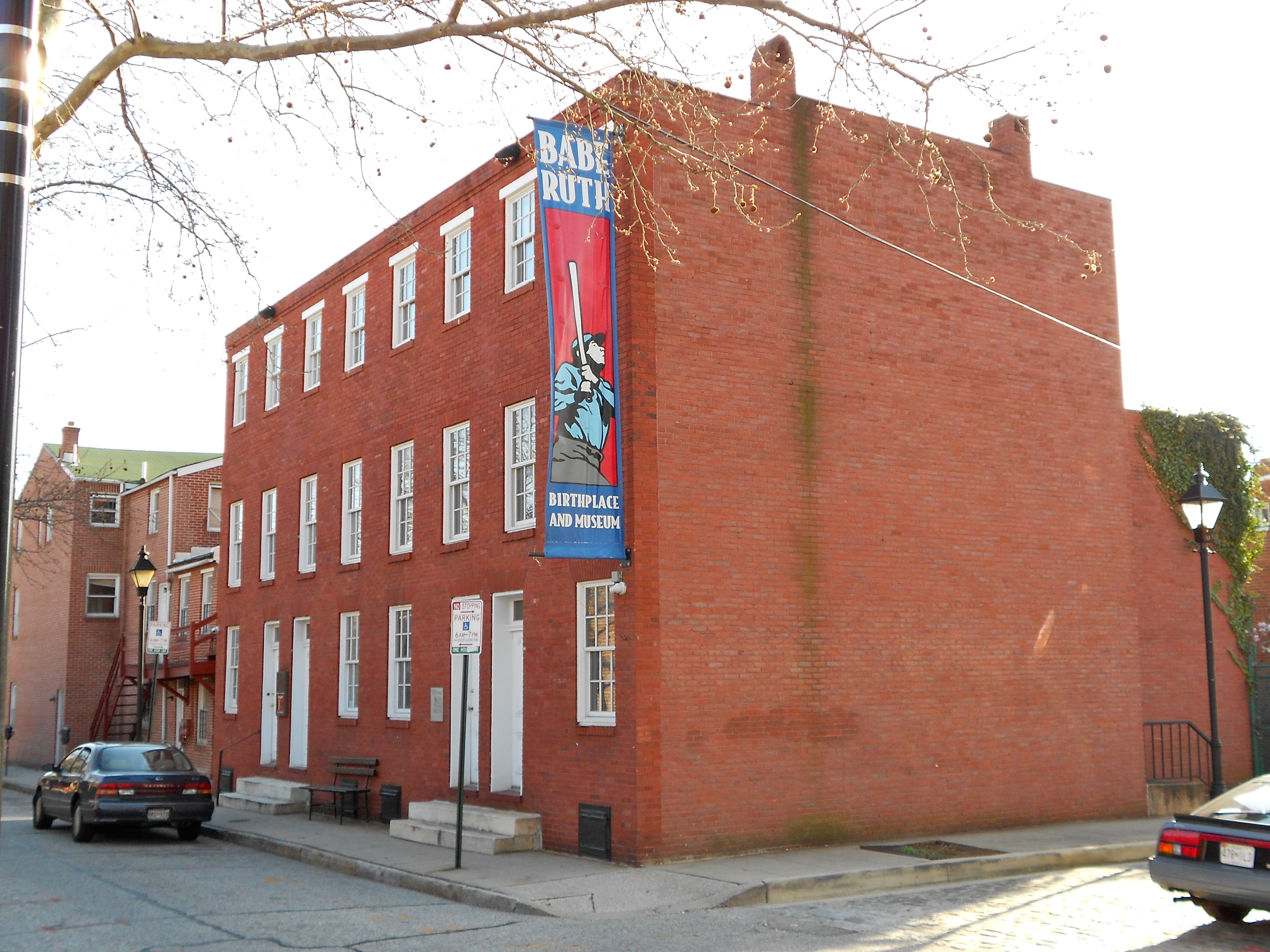
Babe Ruth Birthplace and Museum

Babe Ruth was born in 1895 to parents George Sr. and Catherine in a house near the site of Oriole Park at Camden Yards in Baltimore. His childhood home is located in the old Ridgely's Delight neighborhood close to the Inner Harbor. In the late 1960s, a local group of Babe Ruth fans and Baltimore historians took action to have the city support a museum in Babe's honor, after the house was almost demolished. A non-profit museum opened to the public in 1974 and is governed by the Babe Ruth Birthplace Foundation, Inc.

== Events ==
=== Dew Tour ===
The Dew Tour has two separate events: summer and winter. The Dew Tour gives street skiers, skaters, snowboarders, and others the chance to participate with mainstream contenders. The Panasonic Dew Tour held in 2007 offered a total of $2.5 million in prizes.

=== Baltimore Marathon ===
The Camden Yards Sports Complex is the starting and finishing point of the Baltimore Marathon. The event includes a full marathon, half marathon, team relay, 5K, kids' fun run, and the BaltiMORON-a-Thon. The race began in 2001 and begins at Oriole Park at Camden Yards, then winds its way through the streets of Baltimore passing by the Inner Harbor, Fells Point, Patterson Park, and other sites in the city, ending where it began. The full course is 26.219 miles long. The race is a successor to the first Maryland Marathon, held in 1973.

=== African American Festival ===
The Camden Yards Sports Complex is also home to the African American Festival (or Afram). The African American Festival is a gathering where attendees celebrate African American music and culture, featuring artists including poets, singers, rappers, entrepreneurs, and other performers. The festival has taken place since 1976 and has featured appearances from people such as Ray Lewis, Vivica A. Fox, Elise Neal, Traci Braxton, and the rapper Common. It is one of the largest cultural events on the east coast and has welcomed more than 350,000 people annually, with more than 150 vendors and two stages for entertainment.
