= Alonzo G. Decker Jr. =

American businessman

Alonzo G. Decker Jr., also known as Al Decker, or A. G. Decker (1908 – 18 March 2002) was an American businessperson and engineer who served as the chairman of the board of Black & Decker. He is known for developing power tools for use in the home, including the first cordless electric drill, which helped create the do it yourself market.

== Biography ==
Alonzo G. Decker Jr. was born in Maryland to Alonzo G. Decker Sr., co-founder of Black & Decker. He spent his early life in Towson, Maryland and graduated from the Baltimore Polytechnic Institute and Cornell University in electrical engineering.

He started his career with Black & Decker at the age of 14. Later, after his graduation, he became a member of the export department of Black & Decker. He continued to work with Black & Decker until Depression when he lost his job. After losing his job, for a brief period, he sold soap flakes before rejoining Black & Decker as a floor sweeper.

In 1933, he became a research and manufacturing engineer at Black & Decker.

Throughout his life he was an active philanthropist.
