= John D. Ford =

American naval officer (1840–1918)

John Donaldson Ford
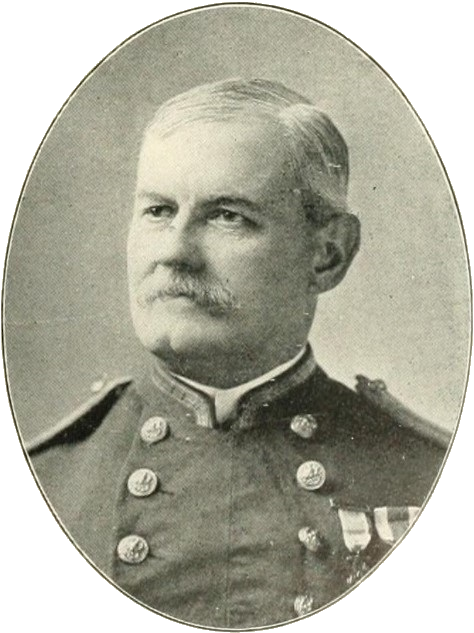
- Ford as a Navy commander circa 1902
- Born: May 19, 1840; Baltimore, Maryland, U.S.
- Died: April 17, 1918 (aged 77); Baltimore, Maryland, U.S.
- Military career
- Allegiance: United States of America
- Branch: United States Navy
- Service years: 1862–1908
- Rank: Rear Admiral
- Conflicts: American Civil War; Spanish–American War

Rear Admiral John Donaldson Ford (19 May 1840 – 17 April 1918) was an officer in the United States Navy during the American Civil War and the Spanish–American War.

== Biography ==
Ford, who was born in Baltimore, Maryland, graduated from the Maryland Institute School of Design in June 1861. He then attended the Potts School of Mechanical Engineering, graduating in June 1862. Ford entered the Navy as third assistant engineer on 30 July 1862. He was assigned to the West Gulf Blockading Squadron from 1862 to 1865 and participated in engagements on the Mississippi River and the Battle of Mobile Bay.

Ford served on the sloop-of-war Sacramento until she was wrecked off the coast of India in June 1867. During the next three decades he held various sea and shore assignments, and, while attached to the Maryland Agricultural and Mechanical College (now the University of Maryland, College Park) from 1894 to 1896, he started a course in mechanical engineering. He had been promoted to chief engineer with the rank of lieutenant commander on 27 December 1890. As fleet engineer of the Pacific Squadron in 1898, Ford served in the cruiser Baltimore during the Battle of Manila Bay on 1 May. For his "eminent and conspicuous conduct in battle" in operations at Cavite, Sangley Point, and Corregidor, he was advanced three numbers.

Ford was promoted to commander on 3 March 1899 and captain on 5 March 1902. He was subsequently promoted to rear admiral upon his retirement on 19 May 1902, having reached the age of sixty-two. Ford remained on active duty as Inspector of Machinery and Ordnance at Sparrows Point, Maryland, until 25 December 1908.

He was a companion of the Maryland Commandery of the Military Order of the Loyal Legion of the United States.

Rear Admiral Ford died in Baltimore, Maryland, on 17 April 1918.

== Awards ==
- Dewey Medal
- Civil War Campaign Medal
- Spanish Campaign Medal
- Philippine Campaign Medal

== Honors ==
The destroyer USS John D. Ford (DD-228) was named for him.
