= Flow (policy debate) =

In policy debate, Lincoln-Douglas debate, and public forum debate, the flow (flowing in verb form) is the name given to a specialized form of shorthand which debaters use to keep track of all of the arguments in the round.

It incorporates specialized and individualized abbreviations, notations, and symbols that allow debaters to keep up with the rapid speed of delivery in most speeches while making a record of as much as possible. Some examples of these abbreviations used on a flow are "DA" for a disadvantage,"K" for a kritik (critique), "CP" for a counterplan, or "T" for topicality.

== Utilization ==
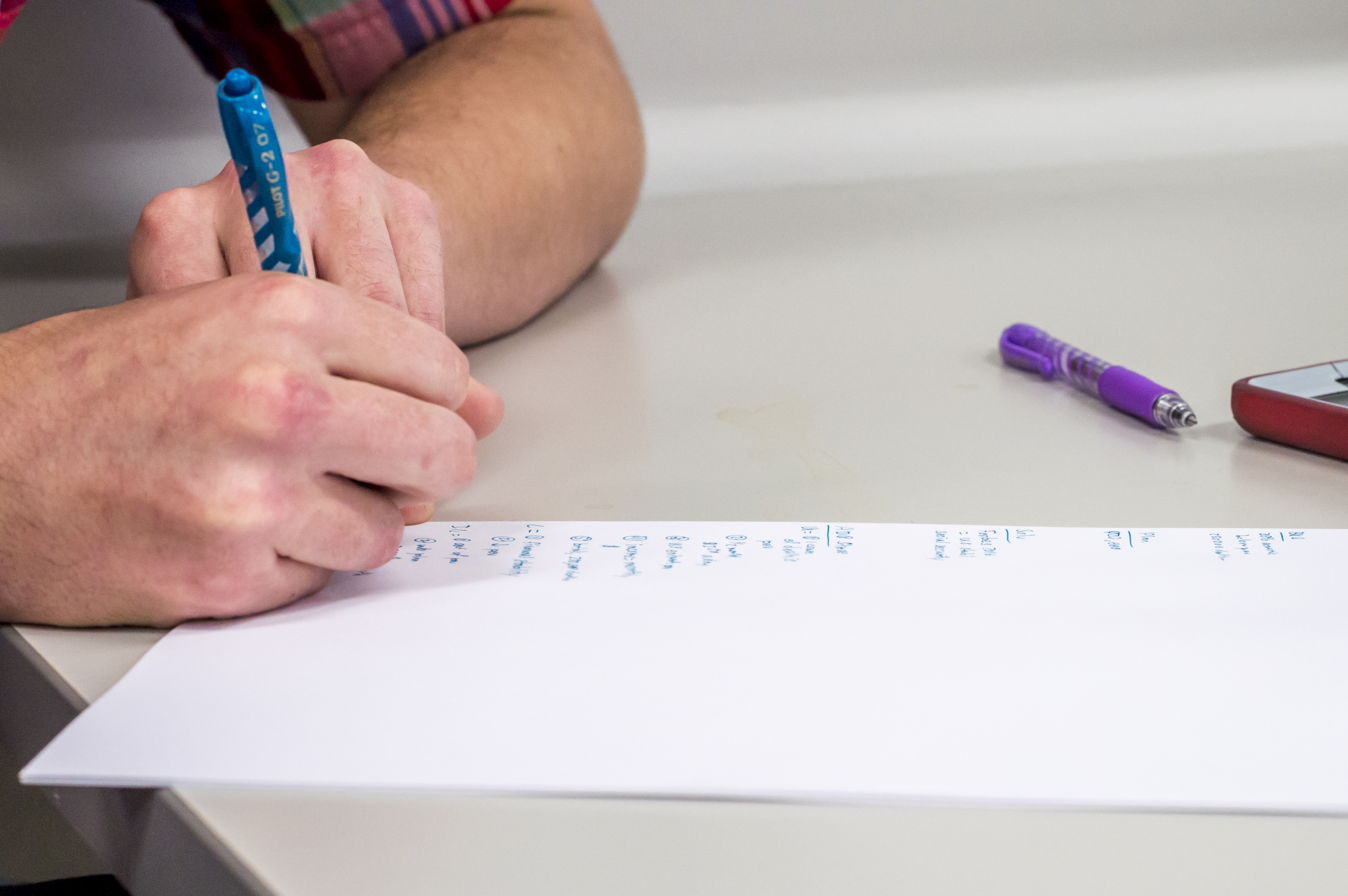
Judge flowing a debate

Flowing can be done on paper or on a laptop using a generic spreadsheet program such as Microsoft Excel. Debaters have utilized more specialized software or integrative programs that work in tandem with Microsoft Office. These programs have been usually designed by debaters and former debaters for flowing.

== Flow-filling ==
After the 1NC and 2AC, the second negative speaker and the first affirmative speaker will fill in missing flow, or do a "backflow", of their partner who has just given a speech. This can often be accomplished during the cross-examination or the prep time preceding the next speech. The 1NC requires flow filling because they need to flow what issues they are going to argue ('take') in the 1NR and the 2AC needs flow filling because they need a flow of these arguments so that they can carry the argument to the end of the round ('extend') during the 2AR.

The 1AC is not backflowed because most affirmative debaters are presumably already familiar with the arguments or they have flowed the arguments before or during the speech. The negative block is not flow filled because the 1NR is prepping during the 2NC and the 1NR has no further speeches. The rest of the rebuttals are not backflowed for the same reason.

== See also ==
- Argument map
