= Advantage (debate) =

Type of argument in competitive debate

In competitive debate, an advantage is the way that the affirmative team refers to the positive consequences of adopting their position on the debate resolution. It is an argument structure that seeks to convince the judge that the affirmative plan, if adopted, would result in a net-beneficial improvement to the status quo.

== Structure ==
Some variance in the structure of an advantage exists. The following are two of the most common structures:

Method 1

This method is more popular and widely used in Policy Debate.

- Uniqueness: An argument describing something in the status quo. Falls under the stock issue of inherency.
- Impact: an argument explaining why that condition of the status quo is damaging. Falls under the stock issue of harms.
- Solvency: an argument describing how the plan can alter the status quo to avoid the impact.

Method 2

This method is more popular and widely used in National Public Forum Debate. It can be remembered as the acronym ULIIT, or Ur Life Is In Talent. Below are the definitions.

- Uniqueness: Claims about the status quo (typically undesirable or heading in a bad direction). The uniqueness explains why what you are debating is important, and sets the stage for the next steps, as well as weighing.
- Link: An argument of how or why the plan causes something in the status quo to change. This is like the warrant.
- Internal Link: How/why the link will result in a particular outcome. This includes evidence, proper reasoning, and warranting. Without the IL, you cannot connect back to the impact.
- Impact: If arguing for the Affirmative, the impact is what can be avoided if we choose Aff, and what can happen if we don't. If on the Negative, the impact is the same - what can be avoided if we choose Neg, and what can happen if we don't.
- Terminal Impact: The Terminal Impact is the final blow - the impact upon the impact. It explains why the impact is bad or good.

== See also ==
- Disadvantage
- Policy debate
- Lincoln Douglas Debate
