= Case (policy debate) =

Initial stage of a competitive, academic debate

In policy debate, a case (also known as a plan) is a textual advocacy presented, in form of speech, by the Pro team as a normative or "should" statement; it is generally presented in the First Pro Constructive (1AC). A case will often include either the resolution or a rephrasing of it.

The case is the advocacy established by the Pro in the First affirmative constructive speech, often constructed around the support of a policy recommendation known as the affirmative plan. While the 1AC defines the parameters for the bulk of an affirmative's argument, the term "case" can be used to cover the entirety of the affirmative argument more broadly, referring, for instance, to additional advantages, counter-arguments, or rebuttal evidence that might be introduced in later speeches (if at all).

== Structure ==
The case is a form of on-topic debate and can also be referred to as C if done in the standard way C is a very effective way to win a case. The case is generally organized into sections called "observations" or "contentions", with advantages attached to the link or link break.

=== Observation or Contention ===
A typical case includes between two and four observations/contentions, depending on the speed of the intended speaker and the length of the observations/contentions. Traditionally, observations/contentions address one of the stock issues and are labeled accordingly. For example:

- Contention 1: Significant Harms
- Contention 2: Inherency
- Plan
- Contention 3: Solvency

Or:

- Observation 1: Inherency
- Plan
- Advantage 1
- Advantage 2
- Advantage 3
- Observation 2: Solvency

These outlines are quite general, and different debaters may retain some or none of the above structural elements as their situations dictate. On an aesthetic level, for example, it is not uncommon for some cases to include creative titles for observations and advantages. A case increasing the number of pilots in the United States Air Force might call the first contention "Air Power."

On a more practical level, recent policy debate cases have made a habit of including one or more contentions that do not directly relate to the affirmative thesis but are designed to preempt common negative attacks. For instance, a team running a case often considered nontopical might devote 45 seconds of the first affirmative constructive to reading contextual definitions of disputed terms in order to frame the debate in a favorable light early on. (Because topicality is a "meta-issue" it is traditionally omitted from the opening presentation of the case, although historically an introductory contention where the affirmative defined the terms of the resolution was much more common.) Additionally, teams might decide to include "non-unique" contentions, where the information presented bears little on the overall affirmative argument other than to say that any negative disadvantage should have already occurred in the status quo.

=== Advantages ===
While some high school regions prefer affirmative cases to be organized around the "stock issues," others have stressed an emphasis on a "comparative advantage" style case construction. The primary difference between the two forms of cases is one of style and emphasis, though in many instances the information presented can be almost identical. A case built around "advantages" stresses the superiority of the plan (or broader affirmative advocacy) to the status quo, through a series of direct comparisons between the plan and the status quo. The impact calculus offered within advantages can vary widely across different cases. Some might argue that the plan affects a "policy" change for the better, or prevents something that is bad that the status quo all but guarantees. For instance, an advantage to a plan increasing the strength of United Nations peacekeeping operations in Kashmir could argue that such an operation would prevent nuclear war between India and Pakistan.

An advantage might also be more philosophical in nature. Loosely defined as "critical" or "critical" such advantages tend to eschew traditional cost-benefit analysis, claiming either that there are philosophical problems with the status quo such as prevalent racism, heteronormativity/homophobia, patriarchy, militarism, which the plan can address, or that certain forms of analysis (for instance, Consequentialism) are on face immoral and should be rejected as possible tools to evaluate the affirmative case.

Some more "critical" cases might also argue that the advocacy of the affirmative should not be reduced to a "plan" or policy advocacy, opting instead to defend it as a "speech act" or "discourse" more holistically or, even more, advantageous in policy debate, the moral thematic composition. An example of the last type of "case" is the Socratic Flow that poses and answers known Inherency problems at the level of debate theory by winning only on Justification, and all else follows. When presented by the Negative, the Negative uses hardly any evidence cards of their own and rely on their own comprehension and wit, proceeding to challenge and improve upon, rather than outright refute the Affirmative plan or diminish Affirmative advocacy, arguing that the resolution or resolution topic should be morally reasoned without incurring negativity. One type of Negative team's Socratic Flow is a cooperative tag team entreaty to win the whole thing, the win-win-win that includes the judge.

=== Case without Plan ===
In "pure" policy debate, which occurs infrequently in intercollegiate policy debate tournaments but quite often in professorial or academic debate occasions, the Affirmative does not have to run a plan but presents the resolution as sufficient for affirming, which is the argument of "resolution is policy", and that is what is to be debated rather than any particular plan that can be constructed. Partial plans are presented as examples of the policy rather than policy implementation that have to meet stock issue burdens.

The difference between this type of policy debate, "pure" debate similar to Congressional policymaking, is that speech-acts and discourse and discursiveness and critics are all rejected, and it is mostly experiential rather than experimental or exhausting. This school of thought, focused on at that level of debate by debate coaches and educators and resolution drafters, has had some presence at ADA and NDT and practically none at CEDA, culminating in a) Monolithic Justification for the resolution and indemnifying some misunderstandings in Solvency and Topicality, the consolidated and quirkily named b) Kritik Blasé compendium of arguments, has expanded policy debate to include c) differentiation with nonpolicy important governance topics, has allowed for d) virtue debate for oratory and e) weighs resources more judiciously rather than expecting a select group of agencies to merely go ahead with a plan, answering the moral obligation question.

Pure policy debate harkens way back to minstrel songs and soliloquies found, for example, in the Babylonian Epic of Gilgamesh, the saga of the trial and redemption of Socrates in virtue ethics, and incorporates ADA's emphasis on stasis theory from classical rhetoric to overcome stagnancy in the status quo.

In the case of c) above, it is argued that policy is different from many other instruments of government: protocol, treaties, the economy itself, "law enforcement", punditry and politicking, a certain class of "U.S. interests", societal norms, and so on. And in the case of d) above, the recent favoring of blurby speaking among student debaters is disfavored in pure policy debate. Instead, policy debaters favor oratory and syllogistic argumentation that still emphasizes the power of persuasiveness. The idea of "attack" and "offense" are rearranged to mitigate offensiveness towards one's interlocutor.

Policy debate, different from debating policy plans, is a "pure" values debate about which resolutions are best or better than the given resolution's stated policy goals. The bright-line debate between some of the adversarial groups' modern classical issues is narrow and difficult to debate for the uninitiated debate club. For example, some perennial arguments are act-agency, power-versus-trust, authority-versus-viability, feasibility-versus-completeness. Some debates have ended and have been removed as unfavored arguments: arguments about regime legitimacy, arguments from positive legalism, constructivism, distinctions between legal implementation and lawful enforcement, savagery-versus-brutalism, the constitutionality of administrative law, and many more.

Not a lot of counter-resolutions are run, but they are considered within topicality debate and the usual stock issues. One new stock issue has been added for all topics: biomass disparity implicit burden. The "I would drop to the floor", "I would be dropping off the furniture" argument is valid, the argument about brutalism. For example, the given resolution states that the Federal government should substantially reduce the number of criminal statutes. A debater on the Negative could call for an outright overhaul of codified law that eschews the idea of and malediction about "criminal" statutes.
