= Value premise =

Type of argument in competitive debate

A Value Premise is a component of high school Lincoln-Douglas Debate case structure. The value is usually a statement which one side is attempting to achieve throughout the debate. In general, the side that best upholds his or her value premise, which was adequately defended, wins the debate. The value premise is sometimes referred to as the "value" or simply "vp". The value premise is not to be confused with the value criterion, which is the specific means of achieving the value premise.

== Purpose ==
As Jason Baldwin explains in "Logic in LD", the value premise is "supposed to provide standards by which judges should evaluate subsequent arguments." The value structure's purpose is to provide an overarching goal for both the affirmative and the negative to achieve. The value premise is not explicitly stated in the resolution, but many debaters use terms from the Lincoln-Douglas Debate resolution as their value premise. For example, the National Forensic League's November/December 2006 resolution stated: Resolved: A victim's deliberate use of deadly force is a just response to repeated domestic violence. In the instance, some debaters may use "justice" as the value premise for the round, because the resolution clearly establishes the objective of evaluating whether or not the use of deliberate force is just when facing domestic violence. Others tend to pick more uncommon values, mainly because commonly used value premises or value premises obtained from the resolution will be prepared for by other opponents, however, due to many resolutions question the morality or justice of certain actions, the value premise is most commonly agreed to be justice or some variant. The debate then centers on the Value Criterion, or the way of achieving or best maximizing the value. The value premise is intended to be a non-biased statement, which the arguments within the affirmative or negative constructive should support.

== Strategy ==
The value premise may or may not be agreed upon throughout the entire debate by the affirmative and negative sides. Because the resolution does not explicitly state that a certain value premise must be used, debaters often must debate which value premise should be used to evaluate the round. In order to support the affirmative or negative side's value premise, debaters attempt to prove why their value premise is more relevant to the resolution, or why their opponent's value premise is inferior to their own. In some cases, debaters who have chosen common value premises may agree after presenting each side's constructive on what the value premise should be. Subsequently, both sides will try to uphold the same goal by way of their arguments, despite the fact they conflict. On the other hand, a debater may strategically purposely drop or choose not to defend his or her value premise if the other debater's value premise still may be achieved, or proven better, under the debater's own side.

== Criticism ==
The current structure of Lincoln-Douglas Debate, under which both sides are expected to present a value premise as well as a value criterion to weigh the round, has been criticized for several reasons. As Jason Baldwin -- the "winningest" LD debater in history -- explains, "First, it is notoriously hard to say precisely how the value premise is related to the resolution and how the criterion is related to the value premise. Debaters often speak of the value premise as "supporting" the resolution or of the criterion as "fulfilling" the value premise, but it is hard to know just what these descriptions mean." Additionally, many debaters who provide a kritik constructive choose to not uphold a value, but rather, criticize the resolution, the opposing side's rhetoric, or another part of the debate in order to affirm or negate the resolution. Subsequently, the "value" debate which Lincoln-Douglas is usually characterized as is altered.

== See also ==
- Lincoln-Douglas Debate
- National Forensic League
- National Catholic Forensic League
- National Christian Forensics and Communication Association
