= Lincoln–Douglas debate format =

Form of American high school debate

Lincoln–Douglas debate (commonly abbreviated as LD Debate, or simply LD) is a type of one-on-one competitive debate practiced mainly in the United States at the high school level. It is sometimes also called values debate because the format traditionally places a heavy emphasis on logic, ethical values, and philosophy. The Lincoln–Douglas debate format is named for the 1858 Lincoln–Douglas debates between Abraham Lincoln and Stephen A. Douglas, because their debates focused on slavery and the morals, values, and logic behind it. LD debates are used by the National Speech and Debate Association (NSDA) competitions, and also widely used in related debate leagues such as the National Christian Forensics and Communication Association, the National Catholic Forensic League, the National Educational Debate Association, the Texas University Interscholastic League, Texas Forensic Association, Stoa USA and their affiliated regional organizations.

Teams in a debate competition are given a resolution (a statement). In the competition, one side (called the affirmative) must support the resolution, and the other side (called the negative) must show that the action does not conform to the principle or that the affirmative has not shown how it does so (there are different schools of thought as to the negative's burden).

The vast majority of tournaments use the resolutions distributed by the NSDA, which is changed once every two months.

The debate format, akin to Policy debate, is known for spreading, a practice in which debaters speak quickly to squeeze as much argument as possible into a short time limit.

== Format ==
The following is the basic debate format. Each side has 4 minutes of preparation time they can distribute among the two prep time periods assigned to them. Prep time is used at the digression of the speaker, and amount of alloted prep time varries by division.

Stage	Time (minutes)	Abbreviation	Description
Affirmative Constructive	6	AC (or 1AC)	The Affirmative reads a pre-written case outlining why the resolution is valid. Some speakers chose not to pre-write their speeches.
Cross Examination	3	CX	The Negative asks the Affirmative questions, in order to expose logical flaws in the Affirmative's argument.
Preparation time - Negative	up to 4 (5 at some tournaments)	prep time (down time)	The Negative prepares the attack against the Affirmative's case.
Negative Constructive (and first negative Rebuttal)	7	NC (1NR)	The Negative (almost always) reads a pre-written case and (almost always) moves on to address the Affirmative case.
Cross Examination	3	CX	The Affirmative asks the Negative questions.
Preparation Time - Affirmative	up to 4(5 at some tournaments)	prep time (down time)	The Affirmative prepares the attack against the Negative's case.
First Affirmative Rebuttal	4	1AR	The Affirmative addresses both their opponent's case and their own. This speech is considered by many debaters to be the most difficult speech, as debaters must use 4 minutes to respond to a 7-minute speech, whereas the Negative has 6 minutes to respond to the 1AR of only 4 minutes.
Preparation time - negative	The balance of Negative's prep time	prep time	The Negative prepares the attack against the Affirmative's case.
Negative Rebuttal	6	NR (or 2NR)	The Negative addresses the arguments of the previous speech and summarizes the round for the judge. New arguments and evidence are typically frowned upon because the affirmative only has 3 minutes to respond to this speech.
Preparation time - affirmative	The balance of Affirmative's prep time	prep time	The Affirmative prepares the attack against the Negative's case.
The Second Affirmative Rebuttal	3	2AR	The Affirmative addresses the arguments of the previous speech and summarizes the round for the judge. No new arguments or evidence are allowed in the 2AR because the negative does not have another speech to answer these final arguments.

Each debater gets thirteen minutes of total speaking time, and three minutes of question time. The rounds take approximately 45 minutes in total. Each debater receives four to five minutes of preparation time to use between speeches however they like. While the amount of prep time is at the tournament's discretion, the NSDA advocated three minutes until midway through the 2006–2007 season, when it decided on four. Some tournaments, most notably the TOC, choose to give debaters 5 minutes. Some tournaments also allow the use of flex prep, which melds the cross-examination time and prep time together to create a 6-8 minute block that can be used for questions and/or prep. Asking cross-examination questions during prep time is generally accepted on the national circuit. Most speeches start with an order often called an "offtime roadmap" because it's given before the speech starts. The roadmap states which order the arguments and flows will be addressed in before the time starts (i.e. "The order will be Topicality, K, CP, DA, then case.").

== Traditional case structures ==
Cases are logical syllogisms that attempt to prove the resolution morally obligatory (affirmative) or morally prohibited (negative). The typical (though not mandated) case is divided into a criterium, which outlines the conditions for discussing the resolution, and contentions, which are the arguments. The most essential part of the criterium is the value consideration, which is composed of a value (often called the value premise) that the case attempts to demonstrate the resolution action achieves/is in accordance with, and a value criterion. The value criterion is a way to attain, achieve and quantify the nebulous value. In most modern NSDA resolutions, a value is often stated in the resolution. For example, "Resolved: Just governments ought to ensure food security for citizens." Because Justice is used in the resolution, it is an appealing value for many debaters. Morals is a common value due to its inclusion in many resolutions, followed by justice, social welfare, or other values depending on the topic. The criterium also may contain definitions for purposes of clarity and/or excluding certain lines of argumentation, and preemptions/"spikes" that attempt to preclude certain arguments that one's opponent should not attempt. A narrow definition can be a spike. The contentions, of which a case must have at least one, links the resolution to the value. A proper contention necessarily has a claim, which summarizes the argument, at least one warrant, which is a reason the claim is true, and an impact, which explains the importance of the argument—or specifically why the argument meets the value criterium. In addition, contentions often include sub-points.

For example, a negative case for the resolution "Resolved: A just society ought not use the death penalty as a form of punishment" could have a value of justice, a value criterion of deterring crime, and then evidence-supported contentions that demonstrate that the death penalty uniquely fails as a deterrent. An affirmative case could have a value of justice, a criterion of respecting human life, and contentions giving evidence based arguments that all methods of execution are inhumane. The debaters would then argue whether crime deterrence or adherence to the principle of essentialist humanity is more effective at encouraging justice based on the evidence in their cases.

== Progressive case structures ==
=== Plans and Counterplans ===
Lincoln–Douglas debate format borrows from Policy format debate in order to create plans and counter-plans. A counterplan (also called a CP) allows the negative side to defend an advocacy separate from the status quo. A counterplan must:

- Compete with the affirmative's advocacy. The affirmative can disprove this quality of competition using a variety of "perms," short for permutation, which describes the possibility of some sort of combination or permutation of the affirmative's and the negative's advocacy. A few types of perms include perm-do-both (in which the affirmative attempts to prove that the counterplan and the plan are not mutually exclusive and can co-exist, which means the counterplan no longer disproves the affirmative), perm-do-the-counterplan (in which the affirmative attempts to prove that the counterplan is the plan, based on how the counterplan or the plan function), timeframe-perm (in which the affirmative attempts to prove that the counterplan can exist in a world after the plan), and textual-based perms (a variety of perms in which the affirmative claims a lack of competition via the specific text of the plan and counterplan).
- Offer a net-benefit to the affirmative. The affirmative can disprove that the counterplan offers a net-benefit by claiming that the plan solves for the net-benefit, that the counterplan does not, or that the net-benefit is not significant.
- Solve either the entirety of or a sufficient amount of the impacts that the affirmative's advocacy solves. If the counterplan does not do either, then the affirmative can simply claim that the counterplan is not as good as the plan.

There are various ways that an affirmative could defeat a counterplan, usually described in the acronym "POST," which stands for "Permutations, Offense, Solvency deficits, and Theory." Solvency deficits and perms explained above, whereas offense refers to disadvantages against the counterplan and/or turns against the counterplan's internal/external net benefit. Theory refers to reasons why the counterplan is theoretically illegitimate. Common examples include arguments that plan-inclusive counterplans (PICs), international actor counterplans, and process counterplans are undesirable or illegitimate forms of counterplans that ought to be excluded.

=== Kritiks ===
Although the kritik (sometimes called a K) originated in policy debate, its use in Lincoln–Douglas debate is becoming increasingly accepted as a legitimate argument in some debate districts and states. A kritik seeks to challenge an underlying mindset, usually from the perspective of critical theory. There are a few different types of kritiks. The resolutional kritik argues that a fundamental assumption of the resolution is flawed or offensive and thus it can't or shouldn't be debated or proven true. For example, in the January–February 2014 topic, "Resolved: Developing countries should prioritize environmental protection over resource extraction when the two are in conflict," a kritik of the resolution would be that the resolution uses the words "resource extraction", opening itself to an anthropocentrism kritik by assuming the world to be a resource for human use and degrading the moral character of nature. This kritik would further argue that an anthropocentric mindset would justify major harms, which, in order to avoid, would require the win go to the side presenting the criticism. The discourse kritik argues that the effects of an action one's opponent has taken during or in relation to the round should outweigh consideration of the resolution. An example of a common discourse kritik is a gendered language kritik, which could be used if an opponent's case has been written exclusively containing the male pronoun. Another example is if the opponent uses a slur (such as a derogatory term for homosexuals) in or out of the round, which opens the way to a "bad discourse" kritik.

A kritik is generally composed of four parts: the role of the ballot, link, impact, and alternative. In order to make a criticism, there has to be a link, or reason. A link can be a certain phrase in the resolution, something the opponent said, something conceded in cross-examination, etc. The link opens the gate to the criticism. Now that the link to the mindset being criticized has been established, there has to be a significant harm linked to that mindset, or impact. For example, if an opponent links in to statism, a harm or impact of this would be that statism justifies nuclear war or rights violations. An impact explains why the mindset is bad. In general, the alternative provides solvency for the harms proposed. Most alternatives look something like, "reject the negative," "reject statism," or something along those lines. The role of the ballot functions as framework for the kritik. A role of the ballot explains how the judge should view the debate round. If a kritik criticizes the ethics of the round, then an acceptable alternative would propose another type of ethic that should be used for reasons like better discourse.

=== Theory shells ===
A theory shell proposes rules to follow in a debate. The negative can do this by criticizing something the affirmative does that does not follow their vision of the debate. Shells include arguments such as that of disclosure theory and have become increasing popular in the high school circuits. A theory shell consists of four parts: the interpretation, violation, standards and the voters. A theory shell most often uses fairness and education to weigh the round, but many other standards and values are used. Theory shells may also be read on the affirmative, usually read in the 1AR, with a justification of "1AR Theory Good" in the 1AC.

=== Tricks ===
Tricks are a type of argument that relies upon the technical nature of progressive debate, focusing on trying to "out-flow" your opponent, or making them concede arguments. This can stem from the idea in progressive debate that concession equals truth, which makes room for some technically abusive arguments. A common trick used by the affirmative is to say, "evaluate the debate after the 1AC," asking the judge to vote only on the content in the 1AC, automatically voting affirmative. These arguments have become extremely controversial with judges, many explicitly saying on their paradigm to strike them if you are a "tricks debater."

=== Plans ===
Sometimes, the affirmative advocates for a plan, which is a certain specified action which falls under the resolution. These arguments are often countered by theory (see below) or topicality. Plans originated from policy debate. Despite the growing popularity of affirmative plans, they are unacceptable in certain debate districts. In some states, the ballots used by judges instruct them to disregard affirmative plans. The only type of case that is virtually universally accepted is the value/value criterion/contention structure, and even that has its detractors.

Recently, methods of winning the round have become prominent that cannot be classified as true cases, because they are used as a semi-independent part of or in addition to the case proper, and do not advocate an extensively developed position. These include the "a priori" or "prima facie" argument which attempt to demonstrate that the resolution is true/false outside of the typical syllogistic model, most commonly by collapsing it into a tautology or presenting some reason why it's nonsensical. "Theory" debate, which says that an opponent's argument or style of argumentation (e.g. talking too fast or interpreting the resolution in a certain way) is unfair or noneducational and explains why fairness or educational considerations supersedes the resolutional evaluation, has also proliferated. Like atypical cases, the merit of these types of arguments is heatedly contested, although both are common on the national circuit.

== Judging ==
Judges fall under many categories, the most common of which are:

- Lay judge (a judge who does not have experience in debate of any form, and is partial to basic and/or slow arguments); usually parents tend to be lay judges, so much so that lay judge and parent judge are often considered synonymous
- Flow judge (a judge who seeks to minimize intervention in the round by judging based solely on the arguments as made by the debaters in the round. Arguments are usually tracked in a short-hand called "the flow".)
- Classical/traditional judge (looks strongly on the ethics of the case and the philosophy that is behind it, especially when it comes to the Value structure. They will not look highly upon spreading (which is the debate term for speed reading, at rates of 300 or more words per minute, during speeches) or progressive debate tactics like counterplan and kritik).
- Policy judges look at all forms of arguments including those that come from policy debate; policy judges tend to be flow judges.

Experienced and qualified students are usually allowed to judge in the novice division. There are usually four or five elimination rounds in which the participators are marked by speaker points (0-30 is the speaker point range, however debaters are rarely assigned beneath a 26 and some states utilize a different points system—out of 40, for instance, in Idaho) and by a win or loss. Comments tend to be given by the judge to the debaters at the conclusion of the round. Comments are also written on the ballot, which is the document that the judge writes their decision on, as well as the speaker points awarded to each debater. Judges are often told before the tournament whether or not they are allowed to disclose to the participants, who won the round immediately following the decision. However, some judges do not disclose and others will regardless of what the instructions were.

In some regional or national circuit tournaments with multiple divisions, less experienced judges are most commonly placed in the Novice division, while the Junior Varsity and Varsity divisions enjoy more experienced judges. Judges are assigned to a specific division based on their experience and some other criteria, and are only eligible to judge debaters within that division (a judge assigned to judge novices cannot judge varsity). Each division has its own pool of judges. At most national circuit tournaments, the judges within the varsity pool are often ranked beforehand from 1 to 5 by the debaters and their coaches as part of "mutual judge preferences" (MJP). A 1 is the best possible ranking, a 5 is a judge with a conflict of interest regarding the debater, and a 6 is a "strike", who may never judge the debater, teams are usually allowed 4-5 "strikes" per tournament. During the tournament, the tabulation staff will attempt to give each round a mutual judge (i.e. a judge who is a 1 for both sides). Different debaters "pref" different judges depending on their past experiences and debating styles. The most preferred judges are usually former debaters who are now college staffers serving as assistant coaches, as they know the modern norms of debate well.

Other regional circuits more heavily emphasize the rhetorical skills required in front of inexperienced judges, and recruit "lay" judges from the community. These judges are typically concerned citizens or parents of debaters from the school hosting the tournament or a participating school. Some circuits require all LD judges for rounds above the novice level to meet training opportunities. Another option is to use lay judges for the rounds, but offer them a brief training session or tutorial beforehand to prepare and inform them about the nature of the debate. Nevertheless, lay judges tend to incline more towards the side they personally prefer.

== Tournament organization ==
Many tournaments offer two or three divisions of competition in LD: novice, junior varsity, and varsity. Novice is exclusively for new debaters in their first year of competition, junior varsity is for talented novices or debaters in their second year of competition, and varsity is for experienced debaters.

A typical one-day tournament holds three or four rounds. Each debater advocates each side an equal number of times or one side once more than the other, depending on whether the number of rounds is even or odd. Multi-day tournaments have five to eight preliminary rounds in which all debaters participate. The debaters with the best win–loss record from this set of rounds then advance (called "breaking" or "clearing") to a single-elimination stage of "outrounds" that determines the eventual champion. All debaters present have the hypothetical potential to "hit", or square off against, any other competitor in their field at the tournament, though if at all possible debaters are prohibited from hitting members of their own team and hitting someone they have previously hit earlier at the same tournament again. Similarly, judges who have already judged a debater are not supposed to judge them again in preliminaries. In contrast, a tournament in which each competitor must debate every other competitor is called a "round robin". These tend to be very small, and specific participants are invited to attend.

Most LD tournaments are "power matched" (also called "power paired" or just "powered"). In this system, after the first two rounds (often referred to as presets, as they are randomly paired beforehand), the pairings for the third round are decided on the basis that people with the same record (known as being in the same bracket) debate. For example, a 2‑0 would hit another 2‑0, a 1‑1 would hit another 1‑1, etc. Speaker points determine who hits who within each bracket (the 2‑0 with the highest speaks of any 2‑0 would hit the 2‑0 with the lowest speaks, second-highest hits second-lowest, etc.) After the third round, the debaters' cumulative records and speaks (rather than the results of their last round) place them in their brackets. Local tournaments sometimes use randomized brackets throughout their whole duration. Other tournaments use a "power protected" system during prelim rounds, in which a 3-0 would hit an 0-3 and a 2-1 would hit a 1-2. In "elimination rounds" after the primary four to six (or even eight) preliminary rounds, the top "seed" will "hit" the lowest "seed". Seeding is determined first by preliminary round records and then by the number of speaker points awarded by judges in preliminary rounds, with various tiebreakers (total number of opponent wins, speaker points after the highest and lowest given to each debater have been subtracted, judge variance, randomly assigned number, etc.) that follow should the statistics remain even.

== Tournament competition ==
Most high school debaters participate in local tournaments in their city or school district, and travel to other areas of the state occasionally. Hundreds of such tournaments are held each weekend at high schools throughout the United States during the debate season.

A relatively small subset (perhaps a few hundred) of high school debaters, mostly from elite public and private schools, travel around the country to tournaments on the "national circuit". The current nine largest and most prestigious/competitive national circuit tournaments are (in no particular order) the Glenbrooks, held at Glenbrook North and Glenbrook South High Schools in the Chicago suburbs; the New York City Invitational at the Bronx High School of Science; the Harvard Invitational at Harvard University in Boston, Mass; the California Invitational at UC Berkeley, the Greenhill Fall Classic hosted by Greenhill School in Addison, Texas; the Heart of Texas Invitational at St. Mark's School in Dallas, Texas; The Harvard-Westlake Debates, held at Harvard-Westlake School in Los Angeles; the Mid-America Cup at Valley High School in West Des Moines, Iowa; and the Minneapple at Apple Valley High School in Minnesota. There are a few other prestigious national tournaments that cap the number of debaters from each school and total number of schools allowed to enter to preserve competitive integrity, and because there might simply be not enough space available. National circuit tournaments are very large events that typically draw 120-200 varsity LD competitors, in addition to LDers in the novice and jv divisions, policy debaters, public forum debaters, speech participants, judges, coaches, etc. Some of the biggest attract near a thousand total participants. Regionally significant tournaments often also draw over a hundred participants. National circuit debate is generally characterized by its extremely fast manner of speaking (300 wpm is not considered an uncommon speed to read a case at), use of jargon, and emphasis on strength/depth of argumentation rather than rhetoric. However, some debaters have been successful on the national circuit without conforming to these conventions. The national circuit is mostly composed of traditional "power schools" with historically strong programs (e.g. Valley High School in Iowa, Lexington High School in Massachusetts, Scarsdale High School in New York, Greenhill School in Texas, Strake Jesuit College Preparatory also in Texas, or Walt Whitman High School in Maryland). The national circuit and its accompanying style of debate are sometimes criticized for being exclusionary. In particular, critics argue that national circuit "power" programs encourage jargon and esoteric norms not as a means of improving discourse, but as a means of deterring competition from the uninitiated.

As the debate season comes to a close, national championship tournaments (collectively referred to as the postseason) are held to bring together the best debaters from around the nation to compete against one another. These tournaments require reaching certain levels of success at a qualifying tournaments throughout the season.

The unofficial national circuit championship is the Tournament of Champions (LD) (TOC) held at the University of Kentucky. To be eligible for the TOC, debaters must collect at least two bids at various designated tournaments held throughout the year. (They cannot be considered qualifying tournaments because they technically exist independent of TOC authority and are significant in their own right.) These tournaments are granted a certain number of bids by the director of the TOC (Prof. Angela Reed) with the input of her advisory committee that debaters receive upon reaching a certain level in the elimination rounds. The level of elimination round at which bids are awarded is subjective, but depends chiefly on the size of the tournament, the perceived collective quality of the debaters in attendance, and the quality of the tournament itself (whether it is run well or not). There are fluctuations in tournaments' bid levels and the tournaments that have bids in the first place, but the major tournaments have very secure bids. For example, the Dowling Catholic Paradigm held at Dowling Catholic High School in West Des Moines, Iowa is a medium-sized tournament attended by debaters of all experience levels mostly from the Midwest, and therefore receives four bids, awarded to the debaters who reach the semifinal round of the tournament. The Glenbrooks tournament, considered among the most competitive regular season tournaments in the country, is attended by approximately 200 experienced debaters and has for many years had 16 bids to hand out to competitors who reach the octofinal round.

For non-national circuit debaters, either the National Speech and Debate Tournament of the National Speech and Debate Association or the Grand National Tournament of the National Catholic Forensic League is the national tournament of their sponsoring organization. Competitors qualify to these national tournaments by placing in the top spots at district-level tournament held specifically as qualifiers. The number of competitors in each district determines the number of competitors that will qualify to the national tournament. Most NSDA districts have two to four, but some NCFL districts have six.

== Rankings ==
The National Speech & Debate Association provides a ranking of inputted points gained throughout events, with the option of filtering out points solely earned in Lincoln-Douglas debate.

There is also a system of points for Lincoln Douglas Debate known as the Dukes and Bailey cup, which takes a debater's top 5 tournaments of the year, and assigns a point value to them.

== Resolutions ==
Resolutions (topics to be debated) in most tournaments are set by the NSDA, and they change every two months. They always propose that a specific policy or issue (the "resolutional policy/action") conforms to a certain principle (the "value"). The affirmative must uphold the resolution, and the negative must show that the action does not conform to the principle or that the affirmative has not shown how it does so (there are different schools of thought as to the negative's burden).

Ten possible resolutions for the upcoming year are chosen by a wording committee and released at the NSDA National Tournament. Anyone can submit a resolution for consideration to the wording committee. Each coach in the country receives a ballot with a copy of the official magazine of the NSDA, the Rostrum, and votes for a topic for each two-month slot. Voting can also be done online. Until the 2007–2008 season each coach could only rank the topics on one list, with the one receiving the overall highest ranking becoming the National Tournament topic, the second highest becoming the March–April topic, the third highest Jan/Feb topic, etc. However, because of the prominence of the Jan-Feb slot (the TOC and several other tournaments not actually in January or February elect to use this topic, resulting in it being jokingly referred to as the "six-month topic"), coaches now select their three highest choices for each two-month slot.

The resolutions of the NCFL National Tournament, UIL (which includes LD debate as one of its academic contests), and NCFCA are selected independently of the NSDA resolutions.

== See also ==
- Value Premise
- Value Criterion
- Flow
- Kritik
- Public Forum Debate
- Policy Debate
- Debate
- List of Tournament of Champions Winners
