= National Educational Debate Association =

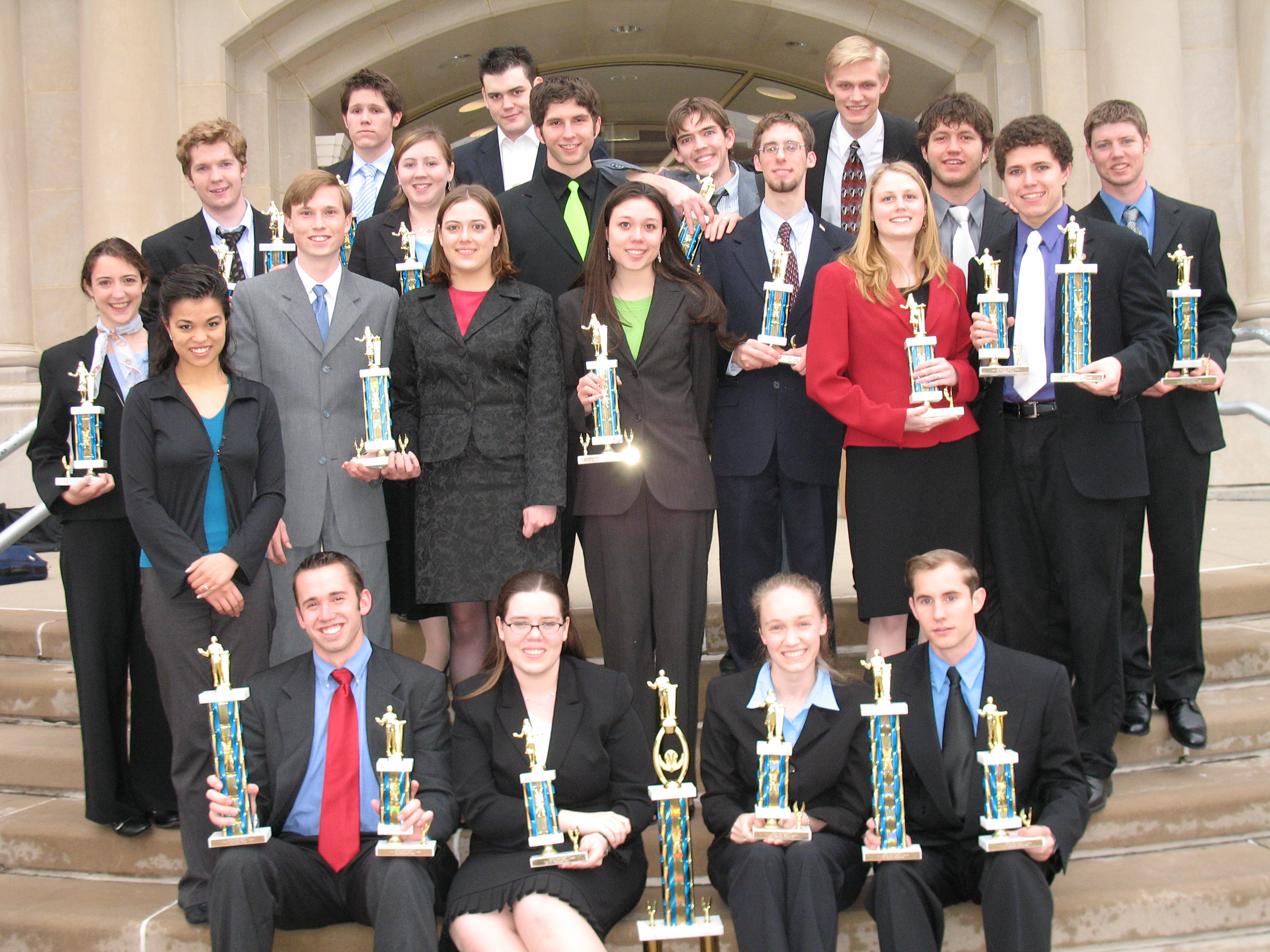
Patrick Henry College's NEDA debate team at the 2006 NEDA National Tournament in Dayton, Ohio.

The National Educational Debate Association (NEDA) is an American collegiate debate association emphasizing audience-centered debate. It was founded by debate educators who believe that the debate tournament is an extension of the communication classroom and that even competitive debates should provide students with skills of research, argument selection, and presentation style that will benefit them as public advocates. NEDA schedules eight invitational tournaments a year, primarily in the mid-west. The association debates two resolutions per year. The fall resolution is one of value, and the spring resolution is one of policy.

Several aspects of NEDA make it distinct from other debate organizations, including the ability to decide topicality at the end of the constructive speeches, the ability of judges to give "double losses" in those cases in which neither team argues in a manner consistent befitting a public advocate, closed cross examination, and a focus on argumentation and delivery. Also, half of all tournament judges are 'lay judges' - that is, they are not debate coaches. Membership in NEDA is awarded to individuals, not institutions, and all members must apply and be approved the governing body. The intended focus is on the clash over the issues central to the debate proposition. The debate is similar to Public Forum debate in that it is audience-friendly, but is more formal, and more evidence-based.

== History ==
NEDA began in the fall of 1994 at the Central States Communication Association convention in Oklahoma City, Oklahoma. About thirty debate educators and their institutions left the Cross Examination Debate Association (CEDA) because they felt CEDA tournaments were no longer conducive to the audience-centered debate to which they were philosophically committed and desired to teach their students. The resulting organization was co-founded by Gary Horn, professor at Ferris State University, and Larry Underberg, then a professor at the University of South Dakota. There were quickly nineteen other founding members of the association. In 1999, the Western division of NEDA became the Great Plains Forensic Conference.

== Divisions ==
Teams in NEDA compete in one of three categories:

- Crossfire Debate - Developed from Ted Turner style televised debates, this format is more interactive, involves more cross-examination, and emphasizes succinct arguments that get to the heart of the issues quickly.
- Rapidfire Debate - The division may only be entered by an individual.
- Policy Debate - Policy debate is an American form of debate competition in which teams of two usually advocate for and against a resolution that typically calls for policy change by the United States federal government. Evidence presentation is a crucial part of Policy Debate; however, ethical arguments also play a major role in deciding the outcome of the round. The main argument being debated during a round of Cross-Examination is which team has a greater impact.
- Novice - Standard cross-examination format of debate for competitors who have participated in six or fewer tournaments ever (including high school).
- Open - Standard cross-examination format debate for debaters who have competed at six or more tournaments.

== Debate Round Formats ==
Crossfire:

- 1st Aff: 4:00
- 1st Neg: 4:00
- 1st Crossfire (with first 2 speakers): 3:00
- 2nd Aff: 4:00
- 2nd Neg: 4:00
- 2nd Crossfire (with second 2 speakers): 3:00
- Aff Summary (done by 1st aff speaker): 2:00
- Neg Summary (done by 1st neg speaker): 2:00
- Final Crossfire (with all debaters): 3:00
- Aff Final Focus (given by second aff speaker): 1:00
- Neg Final Focus (given by second neg speaker): 1:00

Rapidfire:

- 1st Affirmative: 4:00
- 1st Negative: 4:00
- Crossfire: 3:00
- 2nd Affirmative: 4:00
- 2nd Negative: 4:00
- Crossfire: 3:00
- 1st Affirmative Summary: 1:00
- 1st Negative Summary: 1:00

== Institutions with current NEDA members ==
- Anderson University (AU)
- Ball State University (BSU)
- Bob Jones University (BJU)
- Capital University (CAP)
- Cedarville University (CUV)
- Clemson University (CLEM)
- DePauw University (DEP)
- Duquesne University (DUQ)
- Owensboro Community & Technical College (OCTC)
- Saint Peter's University (SPU)
- Southeast Missouri State University (SEMO)
- Transylvania University (TRA)
- University of Dayton (DAY)
- Fullerton College (FC)
- Indiana University-Purdue University at Indianapolis (IUPUI)
- Wayne State University (WSU)

== Institutions that formerly sponsored NEDA teams ==
- California State University Fullerton
- California State University Maritime Academy
- Carthage College
- Cedarville University
- DePauw University
- East Central University
- Eastern New Mexico University
- Ferris State University
- Hillsdale College
- Metropolitan Community College
- Mission University (formerly Baptist Bible College)
- Missouri Southern State University
- Murray State University
- Northeastern State University
- Northern Oklahoma College
- Patrick Henry College
- Rose–Hulman Institute of Technology
- Tiffin University
- University of Oklahoma
- University of South Dakota
- University of Wisconsin–Madison
- University of Wisconsin–La Crosse
- Western Illinois University
- Wheaton College (Illinois)

== Resolutions ==
- Spring 2023: Resolved: The United States should substantially reform public K-12 education.
- Fall 2022: Resolved: On balance, societies benefit from organized religion.
- Spring 2021: Resolved: The United States Federal Government should require compulsory national service.
- Fall 2021: Resolved: The United States Federal Government should significantly increase its investment in space exploration.
- Spring 2020: Resolved: The United States Federal Government should significantly increase regulations of the Big Five tech companies.
- Fall 2020: Resolved: The United States Federal Government is not upholding its social contract to protect its citizens.
- Spring 2019: Resolved: The United States should eliminate mandatory minimum sentencing
- Fall 2018: Resolved: Statehood for Puerto Rico would be beneficial.
- Spring 2018: Resolved: The United States Federal Government should provide citizens with free college tuition.
- Spring 2015: Resolved: Local law enforcement should be demilitarized
- Spring 2013: Resolved: The United States should significantly increase its humanitarian efforts across the world.
- Fall 2012: Resolved: Collegiate online instruction enhances college education.
- Spring 2012: Resolved: The United States should significantly increase programs to rehabilitate inmates.
- Fall 2011: Resolved: Political parties are bad for effective government in the United States.
- Spring 2011: Resolved: The United States Federal Government should legalize marijuana for recreational use.
- Fall 2010: Resolved: Increased use of nuclear power in the United States is beneficial.
- Spring 2010: Resolved: The United States should significantly reform The Welfare System.
- Fall 2009: Resolved: The United States is over-reliant on China.
- Spring 2009: Resolved: The United States federal government should significantly limit the authority of the Department of Homeland Security.
- Fall 2008: Resolved: Americans Overvalue Athletic Competition
- Spring 2008: Resolved: The United States federal government should make adequate and affordable medical care available to all U.S. citizens.
- Fall 2007: Resolved: Corporations exert undue influence over public policy.
- Spring 2007: Resolved: The United States Government should significantly increase the acceptance of immigrants.
- Fall 2006: Resolved: United States foreign policy inappropriately emphasizes military action over diplomacy.
- Spring 2006: Resolved: Non-violent crimes should not carry prison sentences.
- Fall 2005: Resolved: Wal-Mart's business practices are detrimental to the United States.
- Spring 2005: Resolved: The United States should substantially reform public secondary school education.
- Fall 2004: Resolved: Separation of church and state is being inappropriately eroded.
- Spring 2004: Resolved: The United States should significantly reduce its foreign military commitments.
- Fall 2003: Resolved: United States corporations are insufficiently loyal to American workers.
- Spring 2003: Resolved: The United States federal government should significantly increase its citizens' access to affordable health care.
- Fall 2002: Resolved: Civil liberties are being inappropriately eroded.
- Spring 2002: Resolved: The United States should substantially expand its efforts to prevent terrorism.
- Fall 2001: Resolved: A national missile defense system would be beneficial to the security of this nation.
- Spring 2001: Resolved: The United States should significantly decrease its dependence on foreign oil.
- Spring 2000: Resolved: The federal government should significantly increase the use of privately operated prisons.
- Fall 1998: Resolved: Corporate emphasis on profit is excessive.
- Spring 1998: Resolved: The United States should abolish the use of peer jurors.
- Spring 1997: Resolved: The Central Intelligence Agency should be eliminated.
