= Spreading (debate) =

Competitive debate tactic

Spreading (/ˈspriːdɪŋ/; a blend of "speed" and "reading") is the act of speaking extremely fast during a competitive debating event, with the intent that one's opponent will be penalized for failing to respond to all arguments raised. The tactic relies on the fact that "failing to answer all opposing arguments" is an easy criterion for judges to award a win on, and that speaking fast and fielding an overwhelming number of distinct arguments can be a viable strategy. Spreading grew in popularity beginning with policy debate, and began to diffuse throughout the other styles of debate.

Spreading dominated the US school debate circuit in the 1990s. In the early 2000s, the style itself became a topic of many debates, with some arguing that it was exclusionary and possibly discriminatory, as it focused on speaking fast rather than being impassioned about a subject, and some educational companies began selling debate prep materials to assist those employing the style in packing as many topics as possible into their arguments, creating an advantage for those with more money. Senator Ted Cruz, who was a national debating champion in his student days, described spreading as "a pernicious disease that has undermined the very essence of high school and college debate". The Wall Street Journal reports that spreading sounds like a cattle auctioneer.

While spreading remains controversial, many competitive debaters continue to defend it, claiming that spreading enables debaters to engage in debates of depth greater than a traditionally slow debate that prioritizes persuading lay judges over knowledge production.

The public forum debate format was introduced in the early 2000s, with the intent of slowing speakers down by rewarding deeper arguments, and in 2016, the "Big Questions" format explicitly required a "conversational speaking speed and tone". As of 2018, spreading was described as still being "de rigueur" at Lincoln–Douglas debate format events.

The 2007 documentary Resolved in part focuses on the subject in American high school policy debate.

== See also ==
- Gish gallop
