= Value criterion =

Type of argument in competitive debate

In Lincoln-Douglas Debate, the value criterion (criterion, VC, or standard) is the means of weighing the value premise. Unlike the value premise, the value criterion is often swayed to either the affirmative or negative side.

== Purpose ==
The value criterion's main purpose is to argue how the value should be achieved. Where the value is what the debater wants to achieve, the criterion argues how to uphold the value. An argument in a Lincoln-Douglas Debate generally contains an impact or the effect of that argument (why it matters). This necessitates an objective order to determine which impacts are more important. The value criterion provides this objective order and the round reduces to whichever side achieves the value criterion better. The validity of any criterion is left up to the debaters to determine and argue within the round.

== Argumentation ==
The criterion is debated more heavily with a round because, many times, the value premises of both debaters are the same or very similar in a round. Where commonality can easily be found between values, criteria are set up to strategically include or exclude certain arguments from being weighed. Since each side has impacts that best pertain to their own value criterion, each side must try to convince the judge to weigh the round according to their value criterion.

Example: Resolved: In matters of U. S. immigration policy, restrictions on the rights of non-citizens are consistent with democratic ideals.

Because "democratic ideals" is what is trying to be achieved in the resolution, most debaters would find it best and effective to use it as a value premise. Therefore, the debate turns to the value criterion. The affirmative, in this case, may use "preservation of procedure" which explains how their value premise is weighed, while the negative may opt to choose "preservation of autonomy". In both instances, the value criteria are attainable by their respective sides and therefore, it is fair to weigh the round. It would be left up to the debaters to determine which value criterion should be used to weigh.
