= Stock issues =

Five subtopical issues in policy debate

In the formal speech competition genre known as policy debate, a widely accepted doctrine or "debate theory" divides the argument elements of supporting the resolution affirmative into five subtopical issues, called the stock issues. Stock issues are sometime referred to as on-case arguments or simply on-case or case arguments as opposed off-case arguments.

== Logicality ==
Three issues must first be present in the affirmative case and are the main ideas or values to vote on for taking any action (in policy debate or in everyday life). They ask: What are we doing now (inherency stock issue)? What could we be doing differently (solvency stock issue)? What are the results of what we are doing now versus what we could be doing (significance stock issue)? The last stock issue, topicality, is procedural and unique (or one-of-kind or intrinsic or necessary, a.k.a. "warranted as presented") to debate as it concerns how germane the plan (specifically, plan as stated) is to the given resolution.

== Components ==
The stock issues are harms, inherency, solvency, topicality, and significance:

- Significance: This answers the "why" of debate. All advantages and disadvantages to the status quo (resulting from inherency) and of the plan (resulting from solvency) are evaluated under significance. A common equivocation is to confuse "significance" with the word "significantly" that appears in many resolutions. Significance is derived from judicious weighing between advantages and disadvantages, whereas significant policy changes are judged by how much the policy itself changed independently of how good or bad the effects or Solvency are. Policy debate does not assume determinism, but every effect or consequence has to be argued with evidence that those effects or consequences can or do occur.
- Harms: Harms are a way of elucidating the problems or shortcomings of the status quo. Since they prove the "so, no" of continuing with the status quo, harms are closely related to, but not the same as, Significance.
- Inherency: The actual situation and causes of the status quo. A case is "not inherent" when the status quo is already implementing the plan or solving the harms. Clearly, a solution that is new or different from the status quo is not warranted in such a case. Three common types of inherency are:

- Structural inherency: Laws or other barriers to the implementation of the plan or causes of harms
- Attitudinal inherency: Beliefs or attitudes which prevent the implementation of the plan or causing harms
- Existential inherency: The harms exist and res ipsa loquitur, the status quo must not be able to solve the problem. It just is.

- Topicality: The Affirmative case must affirm the resolution, since that is the job of the Affirmative in a debate round. The Affirmative case often is shown to be within the bounds of the resolution as defined by appropriate definitions, or functional implementation or resolution instrumentality through the Affirmative plan. When the resolution seems vague, the most likely or best likely intent, and even the deeper beneficial meaning of the resolution, is often considered and upheld. In practice, most debate strategies and debate club practice regions do not consider Topicality to be a "stock issue" per se; instead, it is a high-level debate brought up by the Negative that does not excuse the Affirmative plan or case approach from defects that are not found prima facie in the resolution.

A straightforward Topicality in-round debate is different from a counter-resolution brought up by the Negative, different from a Negative counterplan, and different from the rare Affirmative counterplan. Topicality is an intrinsic, unstated Affirmative burden in the Affirmative's first speech. A Negative counterplan does not have to be topical, or it can be even more topical and more supportive of the resolution than the Affirmative's plan. There are no constraints on Negative counter-resolutions that aim to have better Solvency than the Affirmative if both sides agree on the status quo harms; any constraints would have to be debated.

- Solvency: The advantages of the plan itself are presented in Solvency. Who or what does the plan benefit, and why is that good or valuable? Here the harms are often demonstrated to be solved by the plan, or the link to new advantages are shown. Without solvency, a plan is useless. Thus, the Affirmative almost always loses a debate without Solvency, no matter how well the debate speech described problems of the status quo.

Depending on the allowance by judges to the cleverness of debate arguments, not all Affirmative strategies need to present a policy plan. They can, as the Affirmative case, affirm the resolution as a policy at the doctrinal, protocol, constitutional, treaty, or such supportive level and present partial plans, typically parts of the status quo, merely as examples. These types of Affirmative presentations are sometimes referred to as "d'accord with the resolution" or "agreement with the resolution" without specifying any particular plan to pursue. The affirmative case without a plan asks that the Negative plan must deter better the status quo harms or be better than the obvious Significance and Solvency already provided by the resolution. In that way, ratification of the resolution has binding effects, once affirmed, that scopes the feasibility of and judgment on the value of specific plans. For example, if the Federal government is already solving the problem, then plans that want to reach horizontal or reciprocal federalism solvency at the interstate level are considered redundant.

- Justification: Do the case and the plan justify the resolution? This issue usually hinges on whether the topic at hand is one that the United States Federal Government should be involved in, or if the harms would be better addressed by the states (for domestic topics) or the United Nations or some other country or non-governmental organization (for foreign topics). Even though a plan could be straightforwardly topical as to the resolution's policy agency, the action of the policy (the plan) has to justify the resolution by some standard, such as necessary and sufficient, for example.

While logically these issues are distinguishable, in practice they might not be addressed individually or in any particular order.

== Other Components ==
Other components have been advocated by advanced debaters and can be found during some tournament rounds of intercollegiate policy debate. These types of arguments or, sometimes, components of policy debate, can be linked to stock issues by good debaters.

- Typicality: Is the Affirmative case or plan good enough for the resolution? If too generic, many other plans that could fall under the resolution could be run by the Negative, making Affirmative's Significance arguments nonunique or not significant enough. If too specific or complex, the atypicality of the Affirmative side is an extraordinary exception supporting the resolution which, while being straightforward, is difficult to support readily. Typicality is often used as an argument by either side to avoid clash on Topicality.

The debate world's pet term for atypical plans is squirrelly: squirrelly cases, squirrelly arguments, squirrelly variety of policy debate.

- Specificity: Is the resolution and the Affirmative case correctly, neatly, or clearly specifying what is to be debated? A vague resolution is difficult for the Affirmative to support and, hence, difficult for the Negative to challenge, the problem of the "moving target" or "patch of fog" resolution or plan. For example, if the Affirmative claims that not going with the resolution will end in evil and the devil will appear, the Affirmative has not yet met the stock issue burden of specifying anything in particular unique or significant or inherent or justifiable about arguing for or against the supposedly anti-devil resolution; that would be a fight to the death rather than a debate.

Another example. The Negative can argue that the wording in the resolution is imprecise and that there is better diction for the meaning as stated. If say, the resolution is to "significantly enhance the prospects of" some social-economic class, the unintended consequence of such a resolution allows for Affirmative plans to include prostitution, anarchy, human trafficking, and such vices. The Negative has to straightforwardly argue what the better diction is, for example, that the resolution is to "significantly enhance the economic standard of living of" some social-economic group of persons.

- Grounds: Is the format, stock issue outline, or allowances within the debate round fair to both sides? Grounds is often argued by both sides that certain types of arguments unfairly overscope, overly limit, or overburdens one side's pool of arguments in favor of the other side. Many frowned upon experimental arguments lose debate grounds and are not encouraged by debate coaches and judges, because they detract from the educational value of the activity.

Policy debate is organized, attentive, and formalized to a fair degree, with etiquette and usual expectations of good demeanor in speech. Arguments that diminish the value of debating are argued at the Grounds level of debate. For example, because the Affirmative usually runs a case and has to demonstrate stock issue burdens have been cleared, running a values-versus-virtue debate on the Negative to shift the debate's qualitative format and tone to Lincoln-Douglas steals ground from policy debate.

Subversion is a high-level Grounds debate, often brought up by the Affirmative. The Affirmative is granted "good faith" in supporting the resolution at the beginning of the debate round. A Negative position that undermines that good faith without direct argumentation is considered subversive. Some examples: kritik is a subversion, homophobia and misogyny against sources cited is subversion, punditry creep or discursiveness is a subversion, provisional plans and tentative counterplans that need too many moving parts in place in order to work by not assuming fiat are also subversive, omniscience and speculative politicking is subversive. Negative subversion is difficult for the Affirmative to counter, in which the Negative can validly argue that changing the status quo is subversive, has dire unknown consequences, a form of Negative Inherency that seeks to preserve the underlying value of the resolution without the stated resolution itself, such as in clandestine operations by C.I.A. For example, inadvertently removing certain treaties outside of the resolution is not good for the resolution.

- Nonpolicy solutions: Are there nonpolicy actions that can be taken within the scope of the resolution? For example, it can be argued that changing out the members of the Joint Chiefs of Staff is a significant workflow solution within the status quo policy that also supports the resolution. The area of leadership studies claims efficient solutions, limited to the few, to institutional problems incurred by the many. These are considered "emergency measures" that have already been planned for or, on the opposite end of the spectrum, are categorized as "ordinary ado". Usually, the substock issue burden granted to these types of argument is "reasonably feasible", where at least the reasonableness part of the solution as a duty has already been accounted for by the status quo.

Another example. "Technically", prayer is not a policy solution but a cultural tradition. A policy that allows for or disallows prayer can be debated, but the prayers themselves are not subject to policy inspection nor oversight. Prayer is a valid support of the resolution, such as practiced by some state courts as a "call to action". The nonpolicy call to action is a Model U.N.-style of debate such as "urging", "recommending", "condoning", or some policy position that is important to the policy itself but does not substitute for policy.

Arguments from supersystem or transcendental arguments are above-and-beyond policy, such as arguments for regime change. Such arguments rank regime higher than policy, because regimes follow many policies concurrently. In another example, an exciting debate round narrows the policy under consideration between process legalism and virtue ethics that affects many policies concurrently, capturing, supporting, or eschewing the resolution. In a different example, revolution is a quirky argument that has seen some support in academic policy debate circles, where it is argued that all important policies have broken down and the only realistic solution is revolution, the "moment of change" argument.

Interest arguments clarify interests or values, to change policy debate itself affecting both the resolution and the types of policy plans that can be considered by Affirmative and Negative sides. For example, an Affirmative running an "environment case" on a "climate change" topic will clash with a Negative case that gives evidence to support the argument that scientists have been the lackeys of politicians and that statistical evidence for climate change are the effects to policy causation rather than scientific discovery activities that are poorly understood by the layman as if discovery activities are done independent of policies, which they are not.

- Idempotency: Is the plan or resolution redundant to the status quo? Idempotency gives clear case argument against redundancy. If something is done once or is already initiated, there is no countervailing need to redo certain steps in or repeat certain portions of the policy plan, the argument from incremental idempotency. Segmented idempotency argues that there exists unnecessary steps or components of the policy plan, whether proposed or existing in the status quo.

Affirmative Idempotency grants stock issue burden clearance or good faith that the Affirmative is assumed to not be redundant to the resolution itself but is a specimen of the species, or to the status quo but is a qualified implementation of the non-status quo resolution. On the theory side of in-round debate, Argumentation Idempotency is known as to "lump and dump", which is to take many arguments at once and debate their merits in one strong, succinct argument. Negative Idempotency, if argued well, can capture Affirmative Uniqueness with a lower burden of proof but greater stylistic flair for the speaker.

- Intrinsic, or Integrity: Argument from intrinsic values is a type of Inherency argument, whereas argument from Integrity is a Justification argument; it has rarely been argued the other way around, that intrinsic values belong to Justification and integrity belongs to Inherency, because that is the presumption of the status quo, and the Negative tends to clash with the Affirmative rather than supporting the status quo. These types of Inherency-versus-Justification debates sometime clash, that is, give good opposition or direct differentiation between them. Are the values assumed by the resolution intrinsic to the interests of the policy plan? Are the values assumed by the policy plan intrinsic to the goals of the resolution? And vice-versa. Likewise, is the integrity of the resolution-as-policy preserved or enhanced by the plan? Is the plan's integrity necessary to affirm the resolution? Intrinsic-integrity tend to differ from argument-for instrumentality but not much from argument-from instrumentality. Instrumentality is the deciding factor of which policy plan or position, in implementation as an instrument of a value, upholds the better set of values overall: the status quo, the Affirmative supporting the resolution, or the Negative undermining the Affirmative. Instrumentality evaluates feasibility and best-fit at the same time within a values debate judgment about policy interests rather that straight weighing of advantages and disadvantages of stock issue burdens. It is rare but does occur in debate rounds that the stock issues approach is not the best way to evaluate advantages and disadvantages because stock issues overly focus on harms and there is a cost or risk burden when participating in certain policies that would be dangerous to the implementing agency or benefits recipient group. The difference is not what one can do as a plan or should do as a resolution but what is best to do, rightly understood, as policy debate. For example, in order to affirm the resolution, the Affirmative can challenge that debate against the resolution must not censure the Press, for national security reasons. On the other hand, with direct clash, the Negative could counter that any topical debate must not avoid censuring the Press sometimes, for protected free speech reasons different from propaganda.

Another example. One could advocate the position that the Pentagon is under threat from prayerful worship. Because the Pentagon are agents of war or representatives of time-consuming war studies maintenance and exercises, passive prayerful worship captures Significance by nullifying disruptions endemic in militaristic policy solutions. The underlying values between the two positions are at odds with one another.

- Nullification: Does the plan sustain the resolution? The Nullification argument is also known as "plan eats resolution", in which some part or instance or iteration of the plan nullifies the resolution entirely, having shifted away from the resolution. This type of argument allows for only partial Inherency and partial Topicality, challenging total Significance. Resolution decompletedness is the argument, typically argued by the Negative by inflating Significance. For example, if the resolution desires "significant increase in the use of" some policy element and the plan, under some weird condition, has taken away all need for any use, then the resolution becomes moot because the plan is too successful. Case topics such as nuclear weapons tend to run into this issue, in which "significant use of" nuclear deterrence does not achieve the same solvency as deproliferation but the opposite, heightening threat awareness linked to civil unrest.
