= Disadvantage =

In policy debate, a disadvantage or disad (here abbreviated as DA) is an argument that a team brings up against a policy action that is being considered. A disadvantage is also used in the Lincoln-Douglas debate format.

== Structure ==
A disadvantage usually has four key elements. These four elements are not always necessary depending on the type of disadvantage run, and some are often combined into a single piece of evidence. A Unique Link card, for example, will include both a description of the status quo and the plan's effect on it. A traditional threshold DA has a structure as follows:

=== Uniqueness ===
Uniqueness shows why the impacts have not occurred yet or to a substantial extent and will uniquely occur with the adoption of either the affirmative's plan or the negative's counterplan.

For example, the negative team argues that the affirmative plan will result in nuclear proliferation, it would also argue that the status quo will avoid nuclear proliferation. If the Affirmative claims that nuclear proliferation is already occurring, the negative team could argue that adoption of the plan would result in a unique increase in nuclear proliferation. If the plan causes no net change in the rate of nuclear proliferation, the disadvantage is not unique to the plan, and therefore not relevant.

=== External links ===
For the disadvantage to have relevance in the round, the negative team must show that the affirmative plan causes the disadvantage that is claimed. If the DA stated that the plan takes money from the government, and the affirmative team shows that the plan does not increase governmental spending, then the DA would be considered to have "no link".

=== Internal link ===
The internal link connects the link to the impact, or, it shows the steps the link causes to get to the impact. Not all DA's use an internal link but some have multiple internals. The internal link in our example would be that government spending leads to economic collapse.

=== Impact ===
The impact is the result of the policy action that make it undesirable. These results are at the end of the chain of reasoning of your DA (starts with your link with internal links spanning over the Brink with Uniqueness and lead to the Impact), then continuing along with the example, an impact would be that economic collapse may cause nuclear war. The Impact is the edge of the sword of your DA and is usually a significantly bad event caused by inertia evident through the internal links inside the link off over the brink and uniquely so.

Internal links are often undesirable things by themselves, and could be considered impacts. The worst of the consequences, or the final one in the chain of events, is usually given the label of "impact". For example, nuclear war is probably worse than economic collapse, so nuclear war is given the "impact" label, even though economic collapse (the internal link) could itself be viewed as an impact.

The nuclear war impact is the terminal (i.e. final) impact in virtually every disadvantage today. While it appears outlandish to outsiders and even to some debaters now, it originated in the 1980s during the height of the nuclear freeze movement, specifically after the publication of The Fate of the Earth by Jonathan Schell. Barring nuclear war, the terminal impact usually ends up as extinction anyway, either human extinction or the extinction of all life on Earth; the most common mechanisms for these are cataclysmic climatic change (in the style of The Day After Tomorrow), or uncontrolled undiscovered uncurable disease. Most debate coaches use the nuclear war argument as a way of training young policy debaters.

Other terminal impacts might include severe human rights abuses, such as near universal slavery or loss of individuality. These types of impacts are usually argued under a deontological framework or as a turn to a human rights advantage.

== Types ==
=== Traditional ===
A traditional DA follows the structure above. Traditional DA's can include or exclude the internal link.

=== Linear ===
A linear disadvantage does not have uniqueness. The negative concedes that the status quo has a problem but insists the plan increases that problem's severity. A commonly accepted theory holds that a sufficiently philosophical linear disadvantage with an alternative becomes a kritik. There is also much controversy over kritiks being linear disadvantages, due to the fact that most kritik argue the affirmative plan over a discursive level, while a disadvantage argues the affirmative's actions.

Non-kritikal linear disadvantages frequently face attacks from the Affirmative on debate theory; the theory that linear disadvantages are abusive (i.e. unfair) to the affirmative team has much popularity.

=== Brink ===
A brink disadvantage is a special type of linear disadvantage which claims that the affirmative will aggravate the problem in the status quo to the extent that it passes a brink, at which time the impact happens all at once. The negative team claims that in the status quo, we are near the brink, but the affirmative team's plan will push us "over the edge."

=== Political ===
A political disadvantage is unique in the way that it links to an Affirmative plan. Rather than linking to the specific plan action, it links to the idea that the plan does not exist in a vacuum but is exposed to political costs, measures, tactics, the overall political milieu--with no regard to Fiat and presumes the debate theory of Fiat could be settled anyway. However, Politics disadvantages typically will say that a plan will pass through Congress, thus causing a shift in the "political capital" of either the president, or a political party, which will affect the ability of the affected group to pass other bills. The Impact is typically referred to as a "Double-Whammy": they are busy not solving something, resources are ineffectively applied, now there is a two-headed hydra problem, viz. once the same money (or resources) is spent frivolously, not only did the government not solve south-of-the-border immigration concerns but now there is less money for solving homelessness of thousands U.S. nationals. An example of a politics disadvantage (typically in high school debate, assuming "politics" is synonymous with the personalities of the leadership) would be: Uniqueness: Immigration Reform will pass in the status quo. Link: Plan decreases the President's political capital, perhaps with a specific link that increasing civil liberties would be a flip-flop for President Obama. Thus, Obama has no political capital to pass his Immigration Reform. Impact elections cycles. For example, in a presidential election, it might argue that a certain Presidential candidate or his or her opponent is currently weak (or strong), but the affirmative plan will cause him or her to gain (or lose) popularity, and that either his or her election is undesirable or the election of his or her opponent is undesirable. A midterms version could focus on particular races or the general balance of the Congress; an example of a single-race midterms disadvantage would be that the reelection of Senator Daniel Akaka is critical to free speech, and plan prevents Akaka from winning; a "balance of Congress" disadvantage might hold that the plan is a credit to the Republicans, who would increase their grip on Congress and allow extensive drilling in the Arctic National Wildlife Refuge.

In some sections of the country, politics disadvantages are frowned upon because they link to virtually every affirmative plan, destroying the on case debate and focusing solely on the disadvantage. Supporters say the politics disadvantages are "real world" and provide education on how bills are passed and politics in general.

Other debate theorists have often reshaped models of fiat that preclude the politics disadvantage. Its use in any given debate round is entirely dependent on how well the affirmative argues that the judge should accept the model, a somewhat time-consuming process. Examples of these fiat arguments include Vote No and Intrinsicness. Vote No argues that the debate should be a simulation of the debate before Congress and thus the president has already exerted political capital, meaning there is no disadvantage. Argument from Intrinsicness is there is no reason that Congress can't pass both the plan and the bill, meaning they are not competitive. The Political DA, as misunderstood as politicians' political capital, has no warrant in traditional Fiat theory.

== Responses ==
Disadvantage responses can generally be classified into two categories: takeouts, which simply seek to refute a claim made by the negative in the disadvantage, and turns, which argue that the situation is somehow the reverse of the negative's claim.

=== Takeouts ===
==== Non-unique ====
The "non-unique" argument says that the impact will happen or is happening in the status quo, regardless of the passage of the plan. The links and impacts (and thus the entire disadvantage) become largely irrelevant since the status quo is no different from the plan.

==== No link ====
The "no link" argument claims that the plan does not cause the impact.

An example:

- Uniqueness: The United States-India nuclear deal is likely to pass now, but just barely. It requires extensive expenditure of limited political capital.
- Link: The plan uses political capital that would otherwise be used for passage of the deal.
- Internal Link: Failure to pass the deal will reduce American influence on the Indian subcontinent.
- Internal Link: Reduction of American influence on the Indian subcontinent will lead to nuclear war between India and Pakistan.
- Impact: India-Pakistan nuclear war will spiral out of control into a global nuclear conflict.

In this case, the argument that the plan does not use political capital would be classified as a "no link" argument.

==== No internal link ====
"No internal link" is a similar argument to "no link." It states that either the link or the previous internal link does not lead to another internal link.

Using the example above, a no-internal-link could either be that failure to pass the deal will not reduce American influence on the Indian subcontinent, or that reduction of American influence on the Indian subcontinent will not lead to nuclear war between India and Pakistan.

==== Impact uniqueness ====
Impact uniqueness is a variant of "non-unique" arguments. To prove that an impact is non-unique the affirmative must show that the link has already happened in the past but the impact didn't happen. Debate coach James Kellam writes that impact uniqueness is an underused but highly effective argument.

For example:

- Uniqueness: American oil consumption is high now.
- Link: Expansion of ethanol decreases oil consumption.
- Internal Link: Decreased oil consumption will OPEC will flood the market with cheap oil.
- Internal Link: Cheap oil influx destroys the Russian and Canadian economies.
- Impact: Russian and/or Canadian economic collapse causes global economic collapse, resulting in nuclear war.

In this case, the argument that OPEC flooded the market last year with cheap oil and there was no nuclear war would be considered an impact uniqueness takeout.

=== Turns ===
==== Link ====
A link turn is an argument that the passage of the plan would prevent the disadvantage's impact rather than causing it.

For example:

- Uniqueness: The US military is strong now.
- Link: The plan would decreases US military power.
- Impact: A weak US military leads to nuclear conflict.

In this case, the argument that the plan increases US military power would be a link turn.

==== Impact ====
An impact turn is an argument that the impact is desirable. In the example presented above, the argument that nuclear conflict is beneficial would be an impact turn.

Sometimes, impact turns function at levels above the final ("terminal") impact. The argument is then sometimes called an internal link turn. For example, the argument that a weak US military prevents nuclear conflict could be considered an impact or internal link turn.

==== Double ====
A double-turn occurs when a team reads both a link turn and an impact turn against the same disadvantage. Double-turns should be avoided as they are equivalent to refuting one's own plan. For example, arguing both that the plan would increase US military power and that nuclear conflict is desirable would be a double-turn. In this case, the negative team could concede both arguments, arguing that since the plan prevents a desirable event from occurring, it should not be passed.

==== Kicking and straight turns ====
Since turns are reasons why the affirmative's plan is actively beneficial (as opposed to takeouts, which only argue that it is not harmful), the negative must take extra care once one has been read. In particular, if the negative wishes to stop extending a disadvantage but the affirmative has read a turn to it, they must find a way to negate the turn so the affirmative can no longer use it as an advantage to their plan. This process is known as "kicking." Kicking a disadvantage involves conceding an affirmative takeout that applies to the turn.

A straight turn is an affirmative strategy that prevents the negative from kicking their disadvantage. It requires the affirmative to read a turn while forgoing all arguments that the negative could use to kick out of it, forcing the negative to continue extending it. The two main forms of straight turns are straight link turns and straight impact turns.

===== Straight link turn =====
A straight link turn requires a uniqueness takeout, a link takeout, and a link turn. This allows the affirmative to argue that the disadvantage will occur in the status quo (takeout) and that the plan will prevent it from occurring (turn), turning the disadvantage into an advantage to doing the plan. (The takeout is used to prevent the negative from arguing that the plan causes the disadvantage more effectively than it prevents it.) The affirmative should not make any internal link or impact arguments, as this would allow the negative to concede those takeouts and negate the turn.

For example, the affirmative could use the following straight link turn to answer the disadvantage above:

- Not unique: The US military is weak now.
- No link: The plan does not weaken the US military.
- Link turn: The plan strengthens the US military.

This would make the disadvantage a reason why the plan is desirable, as it would strengthen the US military and prevent a nuclear war. In this case, the affirmative could not read an impact takeout; if they did, the negative could kick the disadvantage by arguing that even if the plan strengthens the US military, doing so does not affect the probability of a nuclear war.

===== Straight impact turn =====
A straight impact turn requires an impact takeout and an impact turn. This allows the affirmative to argue that although the plan does cause the disadvantage to occur, the disadvantage is beneficial and thus a reason why the plan should be enacted. (The impact takeout in this case plays a similar role to the link takeout in a straight link turn.) The affirmative should not make any uniqueness, link, or internal link arguments, since those arguments would allow the negative to kick their disadvantage.

For example, the affirmative could use the following straight impact turn to answer the disadvantage above:

- No impact: A weak US military does not cause nuclear conflict.
- Impact turn: A strong US military increases the likelihood of nuclear conflict.

The affirmative could then argue that a strong US military in the status quo will result in nuclear war and thus that the plan should be passed to prevent the war from occurring. Notably, the affirmative cannot make any further takeouts without compromising the straight impact turn; otherwise, the negative would be able to kick the disadvantage by conceding that the US military is weak already (uniqueness) or that the plan does not weaken the US military (link).

=== Other ===
In answering the Link, an affirmative might argue that the link has no threshold, i.e. that the link does not make clear when the impact will happen or even that the impact will happen solely based on what the affirmative plan causes. Or the aff may claim that uniqueness overwhelms the link; that conditions in the status quo are so far away from the threshold that the impact will not happen. This second answer is rarely made because it is a strategic gamble.

A disadvantage can also be answered by no longer doing a part of the plan that causes the aff to link into the disadvantage. This is often referred to as a severance perm, because by making this claim the affirmative does all parts of the plan except the part that links to the disadvantage, thus severing out of part of their own plan. This argument is also rarely made, due to the theory arguments it brings up on the affirmative changing its plan in the round in order to avoid the disadvantage.

Also if the negative runs a Counterplan in addition to the Disadvantage (which commonly occurs) the affirmative can make a permutation and say that the combination of the counterplan and plan shields the link to the disadvantage. For example: the plan repeals the Hyde Amendment to allow abortion funding through federal sources by using congress; the negative runs a courts counterplan that repels the hyde amendment and runs a politics disadvantage that says the plan will drain the political capital of the president which causes a certain bill not to be passed; the affirmative would claim that the "perm shields the link" because congress would claim that the courts made them repeal the hyde amendment, therefore no political capital would be lost.

== See also ==
- Advantage
