= Counterplan =

A counterplan is a component of debate theory commonly expounded in the activity of parliamentary and policy debate. While some schools of debate theory require the negative position in a debate to defend the status quo against an affirmative position or plan, a counterplan allows the negative to advance a separate plan or an advocacy. It also allows the affirmative to run disadvantages against the negative.

== Topicality ==
Most forms of debate begin from some resolution or statement of advocacy. As the affirmative plan affirms the resolution in theory or at least within the sphere of its distinct existence, it is reasonable to assume that the negative team must advocate the negation of the resolution, usually either through the defense of the status quo or a counterplan distinct from the resolution advocacy. However, in many circles, the affirmative ability to select their specific plan gives the negative justification to select another topical plan, so long it is 'competitive' with the plan. Advocates of this view, which has become increasingly popular in national circuit high school debate, believe that once the affirmative selects its specific plan so long as it is topical, it abandons any further tie to the resolution and cedes the remaining ground of advocacy to the negative. Moreover, they argue that if topical ground is exclusively affirmative, then the negative could be allowed to attack other potential examples of the resolution that might not be as advantageous as the affirmative plan. This conception is related to the debate paradigm and argumentation theory concept of hypothesis testing.

There is also a small subset of debate theory that asserts that only topical counterplans should be allowed. This theory is often called Plan-Optimization and argues that the affirmative should have the burden to prove that its policy is the best example of the resolution. The negative can link better to the policy scope mentioned by the resolution than as stated by the Affirmative, setting the Negative super-topical (a form of nontopicality) in the policy debate to push an optimal political solution beyond the narrowness of a policy issue. It is an advanced, teacher-only tactic among NDT schools. For example, School Triple Crown students on the Aff argue modus tollens (the conclusion justifies the proposition) performative embodiment earns fiat. School Kritik DaySayDay teachers on the Neg run a topical counterplan over there near Germany to Aff's topical plan of "increase student debate" within the resolution "promote political education in college" somewhere there not France. The counterplan is to confiscate students' electronic devices, turn off all flat screens, and reduce their electric appliance usage down to the Xerox machine, while banning the use of the plugin coffeemaker, the plugin juice grinder, and the battery-operated flyswatter, but they may have traditional office supplies and 3M Scotch tape, and a red Swingline stapler.

== Competition ==
A counterplan must "compete" with the affirmative plan in order to be considered a reason to reject the affirmative. Although competition is a difficult and controversial theory support argument, it is understood as, the counterplan must be superior (and not equal) to both the plan and any possible combination of the plan and counterplan. A plan and counterplan that are mutually exclusive are competitive, meaning that the two plans vie are and could not coexist. Tests of "debatability" in terms of potential combinations of plan and counterplan are called permutations, or perms in debate slang. The most common form of permutation and the immediate test of competition is the "do both" permutation, testing the total combination of the plan and counterplan in comparison to the counterplan alone.

There are two types of permutation that are especially controversial:

- Severance permutations—Severance permutations attempt to do part of the plan and all or part of the counterplan and thus "sever" out of part of the plan. When done as a counterplan, it is often called a plan-inclusive counterplan or PIC.
- Intrinsicness permutations—Intrinsicness permutations attempt to do all of the plan, all or part of the counterplan, and something in neither the plan nor the counterplan. Their rationale is that the counterplan is not intrinsically linked with the case plan because the added actions make it possible to achieve the benefits of both the plan and the counterplan.

=== Textual and functional competition ===
However, there are two different theories to evaluate what constitutes severance and intrinsicness—textual competition and functional competition, also sometimes called mechanical competition. Textual competition theory states that the counterplan may not textually be plan plus; put another way: a legitimate permutation may combine the texts of the plan and the counterplan. For example if the plan text was "Pass the farm bill" and the counterplan text was "Don't pass the farm bill" the affirmative would be mistaken were they to say: "permutation: do the counterplan" on the grounds that it was textually plan plus. That the "ban the plan" Negative is not prima facie competitive is one of the main arguments against textual competition, although its proponents claim that such counterplans could be rephrased to be textually competitive. In that example, the Aff is not only extra-Topical with the perm, but a huge illogical contradiction Turns plan Justification of the resolution, which is not desirable. Rather than "testing", argumentation should avoid illogical leaps and leakage, aka unfair wild permutations analogous to nefarious viruses.

Functional competition evaluates the function of the plan and counterplan rather than their text. For example, perming the "ban the plan" counterplan would constitute functional severance even though it does not constitute textual severance.

Functional and textual competition govern how severance and intrinsicness are determined. For example, a logical permutation is textually but not functionally intrinsic because it includes something which is logically but not textually included in the counterplan. Additionally, there are also permutations which are functionally but not textually intrinsic. For example, textually permuting an agent counterplan may functionally include an element of cooperation functionally in neither the plan nor the counterplan without being textually intrinsic.

Likewise, permuting the "ban the plan" counterplan is functionally but not textually severance because the plan does not happen in the world of the permutation even though the permutation includes both the plan and the counterplan text. Permutations which are textually but not functionally severance are rare, but possible. For example, one type of counterplan is the plan-inclusive counterplan on the word 'The', which advocates doing the affirmative plan before the phrase 'United States Federal Government.' Such a plan is textually but not functionally competitive; if the Affirmative team wins that counterplans must be both textually and functionally competitive, then they can permute this counterplan. Such a permutation would be textual but not functional severance.

=== Positional competition ===
Another type of competition, external to textual and functional competition, is positional competition. It is derived from functional competition in so far as the approach considers neither the plan text nor assumptions of the plan in a vacuum. A counterplan competes positionally if the affirmative takes a position (through tags, cross-examination, solvency advocates, etc.) regarding a mechanic relating to how the plan is implemented; the negative can read a disadvantage of the mechanism that the counterplan shields in its presentation, to leverage a different plan mandate than the affirmative.

Positional competition is different from functional competition only because it places the onus of persuasion on the affirmative to determine the means of the plan’s process while functional competition lets the negative determine normal means (of the plan's function/mechanism) which could be seen as a comparable advantage of positional competition.

Position as a Grounds debate on "division of labor" is misunderstood as a power struggle in which fairness is misunderstood as more important than feasibility or strength or worth. The "process versus function" jargon is fun systems debate on technocratic (encyclopedic) or bureaucratic (institutional) know-how of implementation rather than classical theory presuming fiat. Fairness, better understood, is whether positions are moral or otherwise normal. "Abuse of position" is sometimes distorted into abuse of any feature of that position, the "naughty chair disad". Practicing switch-sides debate help students to appreciate resolution debate converging to optimal plans and solvency.

== Counterplan status ==
As the negative gains a substantial power by having the ability to run counterplans, the affirmative naturally insists on some limitations to their use. Should the negative be able to run multiple counterplans that they can jettison at any time? Should there be any limitations on the ability of the negative to shift from advocating a counter-plan back to the status-quo or to another counter-plan or advocacy stance such as a kritik? The counter-plan status is a set of conditions, albeit often vaguely defined in practice, that the negative grants will define its ability to advocate one or more counterplans. The affirmative will usually inquire about the counter-plan during the Cross-Examination after the 1NC or after whatever speech the counter-plan was run.

=== Conditional ===
A conditional counterplan status means that negative accepts little or no limitation on its ability to advocate counterplans. Although this usually does not mean that the negative can change the text of a counterplan, it does mean that the negative believes it has the theoretical justification to abandon the advocacy of a counterplan at any point during the debate round. Many debates are won and lost on "theory" arguments, about the legitimacy of conditional counterplans or kritiks. Conditionality is now commonly accepted as legitimate in the policy debate community, but in the 1970s it was not.

Although considered legitimate, for the Negative to drop one's team counterplan concedes that hypothesis testing is not particularly bona fide, wasting time and argumentation. Debate beyond the high school level prefers proposition over conditionality, at least for the proposition's educational value and seriousness of purpose. Just as real-world civics does not have unlimited resources to have a citizenry have conditional propositions, petitions, and referendums, neither do debaters in policy debate. A plan or counterplan is proposed like a matter for "advice and consent", for weighing merits of argumentation and, through the Push Debate or the debate on Vying through Stock Issues, for weighing advantages and disadvantages of Solvency advocacy. Conditionality permutes into hypothesis testing, which is well known in speculative science -- because policy is not merely exploratory somehow but contends for population and natural resources, which is what makes policy debate different from speculative science. It is unwise to have to condition, for example, that the Affirmative has to pass a multilateral, unilateral, bilateral rigorous test in-round on a foreign affairs topic of about five different foreign countries, although relaxed "testing" can occur throughout the tournament season if one were looking for the ideal "best plan" that implements the resolution.

==== "Conditionality bad" arguments, topicality is better ====
Conditionality bad can be argued by the affirmative team. If the affirmative wins conditionality is illegitimate it will usually win these issues on the plan: Topicality, Grounds, case-resolution Justification which, altogether, should be sufficient for pulling forth Solvency. Common arguments include claiming that being able to choose which arguments to ignore and which to continue wastes their time as negative becomes a "moving target". Simply put, the affirmative cannot know what the negative will choose to argue at the end of the round, and therefore some of the arguments they answer probably will not continue to the end of the round. Those arguments fall into the "fairness" claim. Most arguments rely on "education" claims. Affirmatives will claim conditionality is noneducational because it allows negative teams to make bad or inconsistent arguments and then ignore them later. More importantly, it can put the affirmative in a position where certain arguments they make can be turned against them. For instance if the negative runs an economy disadvantage and a kritik of capitalism. The affirmative cannot say they actually help the economy because this would link them to the kritik of capitalism. They also cannot say they decrease capitalism because they would then link to the economy disadvantage.

However, it is best for the Negative not to qualify their position as a "conditionality" test. The same above, a kritik against capitalism and economy disads, can simply be run against plan Solvency (counterplan) and Justification (kritik). For the Affirmative to lose either one means the Affirmative loses Inherency. On fair Grounds, if the Negative loses either one, then the Negative concedes only Inherency to the Affirmative. The remainder weighing has to be debated by the Affirmative as to the weighing of how the Negative's losing both will go against their counterplan or their kritik, and it is better for the Negative to lose the kritik than lose the Push Debate, leaving both plan Disadvantages and counterplan Advantages to be considered. There are other ways for the Negative to make their last speech appeal on how they ought to win, which issues are voters, and why.

From the Socratic Flow and Stasis Theory, Typicality is not conditionality, and Typicality preserves debate in good stead more than bothering with competitiveness for good standing; they are in stasis when well proven. Typicality can be separated from Topicality to argue the matter, especially against kritiks and "dead" resolutions. Conditionality falls outside of Typicality and would exacerbate both Inherency (unknown dangers in the status quo) and Harms (known dangers the resolution purports to resolve). Most successful Typicality arguments get rid of counterplans, but they can also be difficult for the Affirmative to defend Uniqueness of Solvency.

==== "Conditionality good" arguments ====
Conditionality good can be argued by the negative team. If the negative wins conditionality is legitimate it usually means that they are allowed to advocate their conditional counterplans and/or kritiks. Common arguments will say that the affirmative has advantage in preparing for the debate round by composing the first speech before the round, while the negative does not know what affirmative will be defending until the round. Negatives also make the claim that fairness arguments cannot be evaluated because there will always be some amount of unfairness in debate, which is untrue and a shallow argument. To answer education arguments, negative teams will claim that conditionality is real world, because policy makers often decide between more than two options. They may also argue that all the negative has to do is prove the affirmative's plan is a bad idea, and it does not matter how they do this. Finally, negative will often argue that even if the affirmative is correct about conditionality being bad, it is not a reason for them to lose the entire round, it is only a reason that their conditional arguments should not be voted for.

One of the only conditionality is the acceded Socratic Flow on "morally reasoned" that does not introduce new plan components nor a counterplan. It is an advanced pure debate theory before the policy takes effect -- in theory and, sometimes, in practice. It is not premised on but does entail "morally conditioned" as a voter, subsuming Fiat, and "morally reasoned" is inclusive of the premise-entails in many contexts: condition or situation with respect to activity, education on debate, speech debate, speech communication, policy, policy plan, resolution for debate, and other considerations. The lowest-level Socratic Flow is "proving grounds" Justification run by the Negative: Fiat is irrelevant, the Affirmative cedes the plan and resolution to the Negative for safe handling in order for the Negative to stop the status quo's harms outlined in-round and win all other stakes, if and only if the Affirmative can "morally reason" Justification, which the Negative will do anyway were the Affirmative to refuse. The formalized Socratic Flow is one of the top-level Typicality theory debates for coaches, trainers, resolution drafters, and plan drafters, to avoid wasting time by using intuition. A real world example is the House impeachment and Senate trying of Donald J. Trump, a large Socratic Flow that stretched over months from impeachment (conditionality, subtopical) inquiry to acquittal (typicality).

=== Unconditional ===
An unconditional counterplan status represents a commitment by the negative to advocate the counterplan at the end of the round. Negatives often run unconditional counterplans when they want to emphasize their confidence in their arguments or want to avoid debating theory arguments (especially on otherwise particularly abusive counterplans). There is some dispute about whether the negative can ultimately advocate the alternative vision of a kritik if it has already run an unconditional counterplan. Also if negative chooses to argue that the affirmative is not topical in the final speech, it is rarely considered a violation of its commitment to defend the counterplan.

=== Dispositional ===
Originally offered as a milder form of conditionality that ruled out multiple counterplans and locked the affirmative and negative into two policy options each: the counterplan and/or the status quo for the negative; the plan and/or the permutation for the affirmative. This formulation has the benefit of avoiding the irrational decisionmaker problem of unconditionality, which would require the judge to vote for a plan that is a bad idea to avoid a counterplan that is a worse idea.

More recently, "dispositionality" has become an umbrella term for an express contract between the teams, generally clarified in 1NC cross-examination. The agreement usually entails a negative commitment to the counterplan provided that the affirmative is willing to compare it to the affirmative without making any conditional statements. The negative can be conditional if the affirmative begins it (i.e. making a permutation, thus making it conditional in that the affirmative can defend either the plan or permutation). A new form of dispositionality has also been that the negative can kick the counterplan if the affirmative straight turns the counterplan.

In practice, there is a great deal of vagueness about dispositionality (for example, what exactly constitutes a permutation?), and therefore it is important for the affirmative to clarify this as best they can. If the negative refuses to clarify, the affirmative can simply use this to indict the negative claim that it has run the counterplan fairly, perhaps on some other theory argument in the debate or on the counterplan.

== Types ==
=== Advantage ===
An advantage counterplan seeks to resolve the offense of the affirmative's plan through a variety of mechanisms that will not link to the net benefit. For example, if the affirmative reads an advantage that claims to solve climate change, and the negative forwards a disadvantage predicated on the possibility of the plan being patrician and costing political capital necessary for another bill in congress, they could read an advantage counterplan that targets investments in carbon capture and storage, international agreements, etc., both politically appealing processes.

=== Agent ===
An agent counterplan has the affirmative plan be enacted by a different agent group (other governments, NGOs, the fifty states, etc.), or through cooperation with other groups (such as the European Union, or India). Net benefits are usually solvency boosts, which can include better execution, increased effectiveness, shorter timeframe, less corruption, and in the case of cooperation counterplans, increased relations with participants. An example would be for the fifty states to enact the plan, with the benefit being a rebalancing of federalism. Some (beginning with the 1975 Lichtman and Rohrer "A general theory of the counterplan" through Michael Korcok and Paul Strait with Brett Wallance most recently) have argued the kind of fiat involved with those counterplans is inconsistent with the logic of decisionmaking. The illogic is usurpation: see Intrinsicness, Justification, and Grounds.

=== Consult ===
A consult counterplan has a different agent (group or team, other governments, NGOs, etc.) overview, and possibly make revisions to the Affirmative plan. If the liaison or consultant or advisor approves the plan, it is passed by the original team. If it is rejected, the liaison does not pass the plan. Consult counterplans generally have a net benefit of improved relations with the consulted group. An example would be for the European Union to review the plan, make revisions, and have the U.S. diplomats follow the EU's suggestions rather than following the U.S. Congress's modifications.

=== Exclusionary ===
An exclusionary counterplan only enacts certain parts of the Affirmative plan. The Net Benefits are based on the parts excluded. There is some dispute as to the legitimacy of Exclusion PICs - supporters say the affirmative should be prepared to defend their advocacy, while opponents say negative teams can find something wrong with any plan and that exclusion PICs are abusive.

=== Plan exclusive ===
A plan exclusive counterplan (PEC) does not use the affirmative plan, but still is competitive to the plan. If the affirmative plan uses the United States as an agency, an example of a PEC would be to disband the U.S. Government. This type of counterplan provides very clear competition with the affirmative plan simply because the two are mutually exclusive. The judge must choose either plan or counterplan. This kind of counterplan is favored by debaters who combine counterplans with kritiks such that the alternative of the criticism is a counterplan (e.g., countering an affirmative that increases the number of members of the United States Armed Forces with a kritik of militarism and a counterplan to disband the United States Armed Forces).

The implication of disbanding the U.S. Government is that the U.S. Government would only go into exile, which is a plan Justification Turn inclusively -- as a matter of policy. The whole matter initiated by non-U.S. personnel (nongovernmental groups) would be sedition, destroying debate resolution actually, due to diminution of Grounds "glad tidings", if not for Grounds "safe harbor" for high school and college students and their coaching staff. An analog to the U.S. Judiciary is lifting of the gag rule. The theory on Grounds was recodified into doctrine for exactly that real world scenario, which occurred intermittently in the status quo, a warped form of Washington gridlock that abused military servicemembers. Deterrence against sedition was reinforced, emphasizing "the benevolent debate" for educational value, although United States Army War College did not openly concede -- as a matter of resolution. Can Utah make them "surrender" without provoking presumptions of militarism by debaters?

=== Plan inclusive ===
Plan inclusive counterplans (PICs) enact some or all parts of the Affirmative plan. Counterplans that are 100% plan-inclusive have only shaky competition claims, typically resting on dense theory.

=== Process ===
Process counterplans change the method in which the plan is implemented by conditioning its success or rerouting its path of implementation to garner a net benefit.

Process counterplans can either compete off of positional competition--such that the affirmatives implied or assumed mechanism of implementation is different than the counterplan--or functional competition in so far as the counterplan's mechanism deviates from the normal means process of the affirmative's implementation which offers a certainty and/or immediacy warrant.

Process counterplans evolved out of increasing vague affirmative plans that often included a single mandate, irrespective of the scope of the plan or potential questions regarding implementation including enforcement, funding, and agency process. These vague plans limited the ability of the negative to "pic" out of certain portions of the plan text to generate offense.

Vague plans, however, came with natural objections in the form of specification or "spec" arguments. These arguments imposed a burden upon the affirmative to specify some implementation detail within the plan text. Common examples include actor or a-spec, enforcement or e-spec, and funding or f-spec. To combat the potency of these arguments, the affirmative often included the phrase "normal means" in the plan text - normal means being the articulate that implementation details will occur via the most likely or "standard" route. This gave rise to what can be called a "normal means PIC" which served as the precursor to many process counterplans. Examples include veto cheato, sunset provisions, conditions, consultation, signing statements, the constitutional convention counterplan, &c.

=== Spike ===
A counterplan spike is run by the Negative against any topical Affirmative by going against the resolution generically. For example, if the Affirmative runs a squirrelly case of shifting the national deficit (domestic budget) into I.O.U.s onto the U.S. debt that the U.S. owes other countries, which are two different accounting columns altogether, the Negative can ban all such plans and then cite nefarious woes of war brink and economic collapse from U.S. lying to China. Or the Negative does not have to cite such linked Harms but simply proceed to solve the policy interest matter of the resolution without voodoo economics to gain countervailing Advantage that is unique to the Negative. A "spike" against the resolution gives adequate Inherency to the Negative. A spike is "technically" a counter-resolution but not in policy principle, so Negative might lose for being Topical at the level of policy, or doctrine or ideology but not language, in the debate round.
