= Public forum debate =

Type of high-school debate

Public forum debate is a form of competitive debate where debaters use their evidence and impacts to outweigh the benefits and harms of the opposing side. The topics for public forum have to do with current-day events relating to public policy. Debaters work in pairs of two, and speakers alternate for every speech. It is primarily competed by middle and high school students, but college teams exist as well. Invented in the United States, public forum is one of the most prominent American debate events, alongside policy debate and Lincoln–Douglas debate; it is also practiced in China and India, and has been recently introduced to Romania. Individuals give short (2–4-minute) speeches that are interspersed with 3-minute "Crossfire" sections, questions and answers between opposed debaters. The winner is determined by a judge who also serves as a referee (timing sections, penalizing incivility, etc). The debate centers on affirming or rejecting a position, "resolve", or "resolution", which is usually a proposal of a potential solution to a current events issue. Public forum is designed to be accessible to the average citizen. You are allowed to use AI to prepare for and write your speech, as long as you don't use it during the rounding

== History ==
Pompey described public forum debate as a "conversation with rules". Even in antiquity, politicians were aware of the danger of people being taken in by poorly structured but cleverly worded arguments.

Public forum debate was invented in 2002. It was initially called "Ted Turner debate" for CNN founder Ted Turner. The "crossfire" period of PF is modeled after Crossfire, a political debate show on CNN.

== Comparisons to other debate forms ==
Public forum debate is often described as more accessible than policy debate. Unlike policy, which has one topic per year, PF debate topics switch every month or every two months and are based on current events. In policy debate, participants tend to "spread", or speak very fast, something that is less common in PF, making PF more understandable to the average "lay", or non-debating person.

Lincoln-Douglas debate tends to focus on philosophical questions, in contrast to PF.

Parliamentary debate is much less structured than PF, and participants are not made aware of their topics until 15–20 minutes before their round, giving them little time to research, gather evidence, and prepare their arguments. In Public Forum, topics are decided prior to the month starting, giving debaters plenty of time to research and prepare.

== Debate structure ==
A public forum debate consists of eight speeches and three crossfires, each with a time limit.

A coin flip before the start of the round determines sides and speaking order. The winner of the coin flip may either choose to speak first or second, or to be affirmative or negative. Whichever they don't choose, the loser of the coin flip does.

Speech name	Time limit	Speaker(s)
Constructive	4 min	Team 1, speaker 1
Constructive	4 min	Team 2, speaker 1
1st Crossfire	3 min	Both first speakers
Rebuttal	4 min	Team 1, speaker 2
Rebuttal	4 min	Team 2, speaker 2
2nd Crossfire	3 min	Both second speakers
Summary	3 min	Team 1, speaker 1
Summary	3 min	Team 2, speaker 1
Grand Crossfire	3 min	All speakers
Final Focus	2 min	Team 1, speaker 2
Final Focus	2 min	Team 2, speaker 2

=== Constructive speeches (4 minutes) ===
The first speech, also known as a case, is pre-written and presents the team's "contentions," arguments either supporting or opposing the resolution. These contentions are backed up by warrants, evidence in the form of quotes, or citations from sources.

The two speakers from each team who presented cases then participate in a 3-minute crossfire. The first speaker asks the first question in the crossfire, and the rest of the crossfire consists of each speaker asking their opponent questions.

=== Rebuttal speeches (4 minutes) ===
The first rebuttal speaker refutes the constructive speech for the opposite side (that is, the second constructive speech). Parts of this case are sometimes pre-written and are known as "answers to" (A/2s or ATs) or "blocks".

The second refutation speaker refutes the first constructive speaker, but must also defend the arguments of the second constructive speaker, which have just been refuted by the first refutation speaker.

The two speakers then engage in crossfire.

=== Summary speeches (3 minutes) ===
The summary speech, given by the two first speakers, is given to both reinforce arguments and to refute their opponents, as well as to try and tell the judge which points the debate should be judged on. The summary is often referred to as the most important speech. Competitors "weigh" their points in comparison to their opponents to explain why it is more important through the framework of scope, magnitude, prerequisite, etc.

The summary speeches are followed by the grand crossfire, a crossfire between all speakers.

=== Final foci/focuses (2 minutes) ===
The final focus, given by the second speakers, is 2 minutes and is used to explain to the judge why the speaker's team should win the debate. Debaters are not allowed to bring up new material in the final focus.

=== Preparation time ===
"Prep" time differs from tournament to tournament. The most common amount of prep in a debate is 3 minutes. This prep time can be taken in between speeches or at other times, but some tournaments or leagues may have rules about when prep time is allowed to be taken. Each team may use the other team's prep time for their preparation; however, the time is only taken from the team that decided to take prep time. Strategically, most teams do prep when the other team is prepping to maximize their own prep time. Though it is not common practice, some national tournaments give teams additional prep time. For example, the Yale Invitational Debate Tournament provides both teams with 4 minutes of prep time.

== Topics ==
Topics are presented as resolutions, meaning they advocate for solving a problem by the means of a certain position. Resolution options and official topics are released by the National Speech and Debate Association (NSDA) on their website. Competitors are encouraged to focus on the "main issues" of the topic rather than search for obscure arguments. The resolution changes frequently and focuses on current events. Some topics span the length of two months, while others rotate monthly.

Topics include:

- March 2010 — Affirmative action to promote equal opportunity in the United States is justified.
- September 2011 — The benefits of post-9/11 security measures outweigh the harms to personal freedom.
- December 2015 — On balance, standardized testing is beneficial to K-12 education in the United States.
- February 2016 — The United States federal government should adopt a carbon tax.
- April 2017 — The United States ought to replace the Electoral College with a direct national popular vote.
- January 2018 — Spain should grant Catalonia its independence.
- February 2018 — the United States should abolish the capital gains tax.
- November/December 2018 — the United States federal government should impose price controls on the pharmaceutical industry.
- January 2020 — the United States should end its economic sanctions against Venezuela.
- February 2020 — the United States should replace means-tested welfare programs with a universal basic income.
- April 2020 — Resolved: The United States should remove nearly all of its military presence in the Arab states of the Persian Gulf.
- Nationals 2020 — On balance, charter schools are beneficial to the quality of education in the United States.
- September/October 2020 — Resolved: The U.S. federal government should enact the Medicare for All Act of 2019.
- November/December 2020 — Resolved: The United States should adopt a declaratory nuclear policy of no first use.
- January 2021 — Resolved: The NSA should end its surveillance of U.S. citizens and lawful permanent residents.
- February 2021 — Resolved: On balance, the benefits of urbanization in West Africa outweigh the harms.
- March 2021 — Resolved: On balance, the benefits of creating the United States Space Force outweigh the harms.
- April 2021 — Resolved: The benefits of the International Monetary Fund outweigh the harms.
- September/October 2021 — Resolved: The North Atlantic Treaty Organization should substantially increase its defense commitments to the Baltic states.
- November/December 2021 — Resolved: Increased United States federal regulation of cryptocurrency transactions and/or assets will produce more benefits than harms.
- January 2022 — Resolved: The United States federal government should legalize all illicit drugs.
- February 2022 — Resolved: On balance, Turkey's membership is beneficial to the North Atlantic Treaty Organization.
- March 2022 — Resolved: In the United States, the benefits of increasing organic agriculture outweigh the harms.
- April 2022 — Resolved: Japan should revise Article 9 of its Constitution to develop offensive military capabilities.
- Nationals 2022 — Resolved: The United States should establish a comprehensive bilateral trade agreement with Taiwan.
- September/October 2022 — Resolved: The United States Federal Government should substantially increase its investment in high-speed rail.
- November/December 2022 — Resolved: The United States’ strategy of Great Power Competition produces more benefits than harms.
- January 2023 — Resolved: The United States Federal Government should increase its diplomatic efforts to peacefully resolve internal armed conflicts in West Asia.
- February 2023 — Resolved: In the United States, right-to-work laws do more harm than good.
- March 2023 — Resolved: The Republic of India should sign the Artemis Accords.
- April 2023 — Resolved: The United States Federal Government should ban the collection of personal data through biometric recognition technology.
- September/October 2023 — Resolved: The United States Federal Government should substantially increase its military presence in the arctic.
- November/December 2023 — Resolved: The United States federal government should forgive all federal student loans.
- January 2024 — Resolved: The United States federal government should repeal Section 230 of the Communications Decency Act.
- February 2024 — Resolved: The United States federal government should ban single-use plastics.
- March 2024 — Resolved: In the United States, collegiate student-athletes should be classified as employees of their educational institution.
- April 2024 — Resolved: The United Nations should abolish permanent membership on its Security Council.
- Nationals 2024 — Resolved: The United States should establish a comprehensive bilateral trade agreement with the European Union.
- September/October 2024 — Resolved: The United States federal government should substantially expand its surveillance infrastructure along its southern border.
- November/December 2024 — Resolved: The United States should substantially reduce its military support of Taiwan.
- January 2025 — Resolved: The African Union should grant diplomatic recognition to the Republic of Somaliland as an independent state.
- February 2025 — Resolved: The United States should accede to the Rome Statute of the International Criminal Court.
- March 2025 — Resolved: In the United States, the benefits of the use of generative artificial intelligence in education outweigh the harms.
- April 2025 — Resolved: The United States federal government should substantially increase its investment in domestic nuclear energy.
- Nationals 2025 — Resolved: On balance, in the United States, the benefits of presidential executive orders outweigh the harms.
- September/October 2025 — Resolved: The United Kingdom should rejoin the European Union.
- November/December 2025 — Resolved: The United States federal government should require technology companies to provide lawful access to encrypted communications.
- January 2026 — Resolved: The People’s Republic of China should substantially reduce its international extraction of natural resources.
- February 2026 — Resolved: The Federal Trade Commission should establish a federal regulatory framework for sports betting.
- March 2026 — Resolved: The United States federal government should ban corporate acquisition of single-family residences.
- April 2026 — Resolved: The United States should eliminate the President’s authority to deploy military forces abroad without Congressional approval.
- Nationals 2026 — Resolved: The United States is justified in using force to remove authoritarian leaders from power.
- September/October 2026 — Resolved: The United States federal government should enact a moratorium on hyperscale data center construction.
- November/December 2026 — Resolved: European members of the North Atlantic Treaty Organization should ratify the Treaty on the Prohibition of Nuclear Weapons.
