= Glossary of policy debate terms =

This is a glossary of policy debate terms.

== Affirmative ==
In policy debate (also called cross-examination debate in some circuits, namely the University Interscholastic League of Texas), the Affirmative is the team that affirms the resolution and seeks to uphold it by developing, proposing, and advocating for a policy plan that satisfies the resolution. By affirming the resolution, the Affirmative (often abbreviated "AFF" or "Aff") incurs the burden of proof, which must be met if the Affirmative's policy plan is to be successful.

The Negative side, in contrast, is the team that negates the affirmation. More specifically, the Negative (abbreviated "NEG" or "Neg") refutes the policy plan that is presented by the Affirmative.

The Affirmative team has the advantage of speaking both first and last, but it lacks the benefit of back-to-back speeches afforded to the Negative team in the 13-minute block of time known as the "Negative block".

== Agent counterplan ==
In policy debate, an agent counterplan is a counterplan that proposes to do affirmative's plan (or part of it) with another agent. For example, if the affirmative plan were: "The USFG should send troops to Liberia" an agent counterplan would be "France should send troops to Liberia." This would solve the original proposal with a net benefit the plan does not have, giving the judge a reason to vote for the team reading it rather than the team with the original proposal. Like most mainstream argument forms in policy debate, they are presumed to be legitimate, though it is possible for the affirmative to defeat them on the grounds that they are illegitimate by arguing that they are unfair, uneducational, or illogical. Because they make it possible for the negative to win without refuting most of the claims of the affirmative case (mooting much of the 1AC offense), they are a key component in many negative strategies.

Most affirmatives try to avoid domestic USFG agent counterplans (e.g., if the plan involves Congressional legislation, the negative might counterplan to have the president issue an executive order) by not specifying their agent beyond the United States federal government in their plan text. On international topics, international agent counterplans cannot be similarly avoided, although many consider them object fiat or otherwise theoretically suspect.

Some debate theorists (e.g., Lichtman and Rohrer; Korcok; Strait and Wallace) have argued the kind of fiat involved with these counterplans is inconsistent with the logic of decision making.

== Ballot ==
A ballot is the judge’s written record that indicates the winning team and speaker points for each debater in a given round. It has been argued that its role is not to simply "vote for whoever does the best debating".

== Constructive speech ==
In policy debate, constructive speeches are the first four speeches of a debate round. Constructive speeches are each followed by a 3-minute cross-examination period.

In high school, constructive speeches are 8 minutes long; in college, they are 9 minutes.

In general, constructive arguments are the only time that a team can make new arguments. The last four speeches of the debate are reserved for refutations of arguments already made.

In current policy debate, the "first affirmative constructive" (1AC) is used to present the "plan". Whether all new "off-case arguments" must be presented in the "first negative constructive" is a point of contention.

== Critical Flaw ==
In policy debate, a critical flaw refers to when the Affirmative team's plan text includes the wrong bill or a bill from a previous legislature.

For example, a team may want to pass Senate Bill 361, "A bill to establish a 90-day limit to file a petition for judicial review of a permit, license, or approval for a highway or public transportation project, and for other purposes." from the 117th Congress. However, if the date the round is taking place happens during the 118th Congress, Senate Bill 361, "Pistol Brace Protection Act" will be passed instead due to the fact that the mandate doesn't specify which Congress the Affirmative team is referring to.

This causes the Affirmative team to more than likely become untopical and have a plan nowhere remotely related to the intention.

== Double turns ==
It is a classic debate mistake for an affirmative to read both link and impact turns. For example, a negative team might read a disadvantage saying that the plan will collapse the economy, and that economic collapse causes nuclear war. An affirmative would double turn the disadvantage by saying that actually, the plan would prevent the economy from collapsing, and that economic collapse is crucial to prevent nuclear war. Therefore, the affirmative is now arguing that the plan will cause nuclear war. While either of these arguments alone turns the disadvantage, the two arguments together double-turn. The negative can grant these two arguments, and the affirmative is stuck arguing that the plan would cause nuclear war.

== Drop ==
In policy debate, a drop refers to an argument which was not answered by the opposing team. Normally, a "dropped" or conceded argument is considered unrefuted for the purposes of evaluating a debate.

"Silence is compliance." (Sometimes, "Silence is consent" or "Silence is consensus".) Debaters tend to use this as a general rule while evaluating a debate round. If a team says nothing against an argument, then because 'silence is compliance', they must agree to whatever the argument was.

An argument is normally considered dropped if it is not answered in the speech in which the opposing team has the first opportunity to answer it. Generally, in the first affirmative rebuttal, the speaker is required to answer all arguments made so far by the negative team. This is because if the affirmative chooses to respond to the arguments in the second affirmative rebuttal, it reaffirms affirmative ground and strength because the affirmative gets the last speech, leaving the negative with no way to refute any argument made.

Many debaters refer to dropped arguments as "conceded," "unanswered," or "unrefuted" or "stands in good stead".

Some judges will not evaluate some arguments, even when they are dropped, such as arguments labeled "voting issues" but which are unsupported by warrants. For example, "the sky is blue, vote affirmative" is an argument that most judges would believe does not need to be answered.

Debaters sometimes use the "dropped egg" argument to refer to arguments dropped by the opposing team, stating that "A dropped argument is like a dropped egg. Once an egg is dropped, it cannot be fixed (or whole) again. Therefore, you should disregard their argument..." etc. This argument is optimal for lay, or parent, judges who need a reference to real life to understand the sophisticated arguments in a policy debate round.

== Fiat ==
Fiat (Latin for 'let it be done') is a theoretical, "throwaway assumption" and convention that "represents a willing suspension of disbelief which allows us to pretend that the plan advocated by the affirmative team is already in action." Derived from the word should in the resolution, it means that the crux of the resolution is debated, rather than the political feasibility of enactment of a given plan, thus allowing an affirmative team to proceed with proposing a plan. An example: a student at a high school debate argues that increases in United States support of United Nations peacekeeping may help to render the United States more multilateral. Such an increase is very unlikely to occur from the debate judge voting for the Affirmative, but fiat allows the student to side-step this practicality, and argue on the substance of the idea at the level of an ideal, as if it could be immediately enacted.

Because of the presumption of fiat, enactment is considered the same as enforcement, which is quite different from merely ratification or adoption of the resolution. Presumption grants that the agency, such as Congress, are sincere and diligent civil servants who do not quibble over the plan as any part of their regular duties, the presumption of "perfect obedience for the plan's enactment". However, in "pure" policy debate without an Affirmative plan, fiat is also ignored yet does not assume but has to account for the moral agency of the resolution.

There are different theories regarding presumption of fiat:

"Normal means" – going through the same political process comparable with normal legislative processes. There is no overarching, accepted definition of the legislative pathways which constitute "normal means," but clarification about what an affirmative team regards as "normal means" can be obtained as part of cross-examination by the negative team.

"Infinite" or "durable fiat" – the degree to which an ideal, or "fiated", action is considered feasible. In many policy debates, debaters argue about the reversibility "fiated" actions. For example, in a debate about whether the United States Federal Government should implement new regulations to reduce climate change, a Negative team might argue that regulations would be repealed if the Republican Party gained control of the Presidency or Congress. Various interpretations of fiats have been constructed in order to promote more realistic political punditry that is different from policy debate.

"Intrinsic means" – are the same means as the status quo without having to justify discovery or extraordinary support of those means. For example, if the plan's agency is C.I.A., there is no need to go into a lengthy discussion about classification methods and clearances. Significance can be argued that capturing the status quo's intrinsic means gives a Solvency boost without the destabilization that would result in other harms or the same status quo harms. Intrinsic means grants justification of status quo capabilities but none of its inherency vis-a-vis the resolution.

Fiat is not taken for granted but is granted to end political discourse, palace intrigue, vote-getting in election politicking, identity politicking, and promote academic debate on policy matters while disregarding the exact partisan composition needed to implement a plan. For example, both Affirmative and Negative teams can cite political double-whammies or backlash as disadvantages: if United States troops are sent to a foreign country, the majority political party that was pro-deployment will not be re-elected and cannot sustain their military objectives, the quagmire argument. It does not matter who is in power and their party affiliation, it matters that whosoever is in power already can benefit from the plan, if that is the argument. Usually, Affirmative plans are not about re-electing officials but are honed toward nonelected groups and other countries who are beneficiaries of the plan.

In policy debate, fiating the plan is almost always granted without argument, to help debaters and judges evaluate the merits of a plan as though the plan happens. From there, debate ensues, and it is valid to argue that the Affirmative plan is more expensive in dollars than the Negative counterplan, for example, where fiat is granted to both sides. Fiat almost always does not have to be debated in policy debate but should be taught by coaches and understood by debaters for what they are doing in the activity of academic policy debate.

Note that these types of arguments about fiat, that incorrectly assumes fiat is a process argument, are rarely distinguishable from counter-resolutions and nontopicality and are therefore frowned upon by judges:

- Post-fiat arguments attempt to show that the consequences of passing and enacting the affirmative plan would be in some way worse than the harms described by the affirmative. Such arguments are labelled post-fiat because they require the supposition of a world where the plan is passed and implemented. This sort of argument is no different from straightforward Negative Solvency, the tactic that refutes the Aff plan Solvency.
- Pre-fiat arguments are arguments that relate to in-round issues. Examples include: nontopicality arguments (the affirmative is not within the resolution, therefore preventing the negative from running an argument they would have otherwise been able to run) and language kritiks (those chastising the affirmative for using inappropriate or meritless language). The team making a pre-fiat argument will argue that the pre-fiat argument should be evaluated before any other argument in the round, or at least is an important major plank that has to be supported throughout the round. This is also what makes Topicality a "voter" issue, as exploitation (and other debate theory arguments) are pre-fiat. However, it is incorrect in academic policy debate, to argue Topicality is related to fiat, which it is not. It is credible, however, to make the realignment requirement an argument, that status quo corruption working against plan feasibility is unique to the resolution or plan not addressed by the Harms plank. For example, in a resolution calling for "should substantially reduce tax rates", the Affirmative can be topical by ousting the mafia from all Affirmative plans linked from the resolution. Rather than arguing fiat, the Negative can give direct clash by arguing advantage-turn into disadvantage against Affirmative Solvency, by presenting evidence that the lackluster Federal Bureau of Investigation is more costly to everyone's tax rate already and will never be able to thoroughly oust the mafia.

== Harms ==
Harms are a stock issue in policy debate which refer to problems inherent in the status quo. These problems are cited as actual (occurring presently outside the activity of the debate round in the status quo). Harms are different from threats, which are potential harms (not currently occurring in the status quo, but with the possibility of occurring in the future). In the case of potential harms, the policy offered by the affirmative functions as a preventive measure or "sure deterrence".

As is so often the case in academic debate, the bigger the harms, the bigger the impacts. For example, many teams enjoy running the nuclear outfall Harms plank, drawing mushroom clouds on their debate round flowsheets. It has also been argued that "small things can have big impacts", giving a boost to the Significance stock issue. An example of this is to argue that solving dirty nukes made of plutonium is more advantageous than exploiting further mutually assured destruction deterrence theory.

A Negative strategy that does not give direct clash to the Affirmative plan argues against the resolution's hidden harms without arguing against the plan, the unmasking harms strategy that helps the underprepared Negative team who do not have much experience with the Affirmative plan's details. This strategy is useful in the early rounds of a debate tournament.

== Impact turns ==
Example: If the negative argued the plan would cause nuclear war, which is bad so the affirmative could impact turn by arguing that nuclear war is an on-face positive event (perhaps in preventing the development of even more deadly weapons in the future). Does Oppenheimer's nuke face deserve a bullet to it or should debate end and his friend turn down the Manhattan Project?

An impact turn requires impact calculus, that is: the reasons nuclear war is good must outweigh the reasons why nuclear war is bad.

Very often, kritiks are subject to impact turns on account of their Grounds missed opportunities, sometimes also their nebulous impacts; a critique of the state declaring that the purported increase in state power that the plan creates is bad because it unduly exercises power and forces citizens into doing things that they would not choose to do otherwise might be impact turned by first mitigating the harm the state does and then saying that other things the state does — such as safeguarding domestic tranquility — are good.

== Inherency ==
Inherency is a stock issue in policy debate that refers to a barrier that keeps a harm from being solved in the status quo.

There are four main types of inherency:

- Structural inherency: Laws or other barriers to the implementation of the plan. An example of this would be a plan under which the United States federal government imposes unilateral tariffs and quotas to prevent international trade. This plan is inherent because it goes against current World Trade Organization laws.
- Gap inherency: Although the present system is aware that the problem exists, the steps in place fail to solve the existing harms. An example of this would be a plan removing all American forces from Afghanistan claiming that, although some troops are being removed from Afghanistan in the status quo, not all troops are being removed and the harms of military presence still exist.
- Attitudinal inherency: Beliefs or attitudes which prevent the implementation of the plan. An example of this would be a plan under which the United States federal government eliminates all immigration laws concerning Mexico. This plan is inherent because the general attitude of Americans is that such increases in immigration would increase unemployment. Although an "attitude" is not part of speech communication, and the correct rubric is "Essential inherency", most debate schools still refer to the phenomenon as "attitudinal".
- Existential inherency: Perhaps the strangest of the four, this claims that the plan won't be implemented simply because there is no reason it would be. An example of this would be a plan under which the United States federal government makes playing the board game Monopoly illegal. It may be possible to prove this plan to be a good idea; however, it is inherent and won't happen simply because it hasn't and probably won't. Another example of Existential Inherency would be that the Plan is already in action, therefore, there's no reason to implement it.

Despite the classification of these four as the "main types" of inherency, the existence of other types are subject to theory (much like a substantial part of the lexicon for the event). In higher level policy debate inherency has become a non issue. There are some judges who will not vote on it, and negative teams do not run it often because it may contradict uniqueness arguments on disadvantages. However, inherency arguments are more likely to be run with a "Stocks Issues" judge who could hold that the absence of an inherent barrier is enough to merit an affirmative loss.

In doctrinal disputes, Inherency is only a nonissue when there is organizational consensus. Policy debate ensues, of the academic and nonacademic varieties, in re-evaluating or "rescuing" Inherency. For example, the Status Quo Inherency is used in academic debate to scope resolutions, affirmative plans, and the types of evidence in a formal academic debate. In Lincoln-Douglas debate, as opposed to policy debate, there is no need to "rescue Inherency", because the status quo is not required for the debate.

The classical form of Inherency belongs to the Negative as Status Quo Inherency, which succinctly states that "there is unknown danger in change".

Argumentation Inherency, a stock issue, does not refer so much to plans and counterplans in policy debate or the resolution but to fairness in competitive debate. Affirmative Inherency does not have to explicitly overcome apathy or even be mentioned, because Argumentation Inherency endows the Affirmative with merit, for example, for merely attempting to run a plan on the resolution, which prima facie fulfills the resolution in a particular case, the plan. There are Affirmative positions that support the resolution without running a plan, and they tend to do so on Inherency only, a powerful strategy. Negative Inherency tends to strategize how one ought to vote about the resolution, accepting that the terms of the debate is fair but that the resolution ought to be defeated. Just as stock issue debate does not require the Affirmative to run a plan, stock issue debate does not require the Negative to completely defeat the Affirmative but merely negate the resolution on lack of justifiability, or Negative Justification.

In policy debate, failing Historical Inherency is a sure way for the Affirmative to not win the debate round. If something has already been done, the outcome is known, regardless whether the phenomenon of the results still exist in the status quo or has somehow returned. Likewise, arguments by the Negative that ignore historical precedence that tend to be the same as or worse than the status quo's current harms, does not give any automatic advantage to the Affirmative either. For example, in-round, if in Year A the resolution says "substantially change" and many teams have already debated that, and in Year B the resolution says "substantially increase", on the same topic, the winning debates in Year A already have many winning arguments that can be presented in Year B. Another example, on-topic, if in Year A many winning teams have supported revolution (revolutions are less bloody than nuclear war), but in Year B there are teams running counterarguments against revolution, the reasons why supporting revolutions is a winning advantage is still difficult to thwart in one's advocacy that does not include revolution.

== Interlocutor ==
An interlocutor is, generically, to whom one speaks. In debate an interlocutor is one of the teams on the debate circuit, as well the judges and coaches. The subjects of the debate topic, typically a government agency, is not the interlocutor; the debate rounds are not addressed to them.

Within the topic of the debate, a group that enacts a certain policy action is the policy group; if by an individual, the individual is the policy leader, such as a head of state. If a plan were to have the U.S. send humanitarian aid to Sudan, then the policy group, the folks who are expected to implement the plan, would be the United States federal government.

Many times, institutional groups are subdivided into more specific "agents".

The most common agents include the Supreme Court, the President (usually through the use of an Executive Order), and Congress. Sometimes, the policy groups get smaller in numbers and devolve into Executive agencies. For example, on a previous high school debate topic – the use of renewable energy – the plan could use the Department of Energy.

Sometimes the Negative will use a counterplan to solve for the harms of the affirmative and the most common method of doing so is by the use of an agent counterplan, which simply does the mandates of the Affirmative plan through the use of another agent. Sometimes, the Negative will even use another country. If the Affirmative plan were to send peacekeeping troops to Congo, then the Negative would have Bangladesh (or any other country), do it.

During a debate speech, the interlocutor is the judge or panel of judges. The speech is fluid, without interruptions, and must not ask the judge to respond. The debater is speaking to the judge, not inquiring anything of the judge while giving a speech. During cross-examination, the interlocutor is the opposing team's debater.

== Internal Link turns ==
Example: If the negative argued the plan would cause the economy to collapse, resulting in war the affirmative could internal link turn by arguing that economic decline would actually decrease the desire to go to war.

== Judge ==
A judge refers to the individual responsible for determining the winner and loser of a policy debate round as well as assessing the relative merit of the speakers. Judges must resolve the complex issues presented in short time while, ideally, avoiding inserting their own personal beliefs that might cloud impartiality. Each judge follows a paradigm, which they use to determine who wins the round.

There are five main types of judge's judgment philosophies, sometimes called judge paradigms:

- Stock Issues: Will ideally vote mainly based on the affirmative case's stock issues, and will usually vote negative if the affirmative has lost at least one of them.
- Policymaker: Will see whichever team has the most net beneficial policy option as the winner. It is often advised for the negative team to run a Counterplan, as it gives the judge a better option than doing nothing instead of the affirmative case.
- Tabula Rasa: Latin for blank slate, these judges will view the debate round without any pre-conceived notions of what's important in debate, and will allow the debaters to provide interpretations on how to view the round.
- Theorist: Will decide the winner of the round based on the strategy employed by the debaters, as they see debate as an activity about one or more theories. Each side of the debate inevitably follows a theory, whether mentioned or not in-round by the debaters, and the judge weighs competing theories as to which one was best promoted that deserves to win.
- Lay Judges: Judges who have little to no experience in debate, and isn't familiar with the terminology or format of the activity. On the other hand, experienced judges may set a low threshold of persuasion for the debaters, such as the "naive judge" or the "layman judge" or the "teenager". That is, if the debaters cannot persuade somebody who has never heard of the topic but can understand standard speech and enjoys listening to a good debate, then too much "debate-tease", debate jargon, diminishes persuasion needed to win the round of debate.

== Link turns ==
Example: If the negative argued the plan would destroy the economy, the affirmative would link turn this argument by arguing that the plan would help the economy.

A link turn requires that the affirmative win that there is no uniqueness (Uniqueness says that the disadvantage will not occur in the status quo). In the above example, in order to link turn effectively, the affirmative would need to win that the economy would collapse. Otherwise, the Negative can kick the disadvantage, arguing it is a moot issue, by saying that economic collapse will not occur in the status quo, so the prevention of a non-existent event carries no advantage.

== Kritik ==
A kritik (from the German Kritik, meaning "critique" or "criticism") is a form of argument in policy debate that challenges a certain mindset or assumption made by the opposing team, often from the perspective of critical theory. A kritik can either be deployed by the negative team to challenge the affirmative advocacy or by the affirmative team to counterpose the status quo or the negative advocacy. The structure of the kritik is generally similar to that of the disadvantage in that it includes a link and an impact or implication. Unlike the disadvantage, however, it excludes uniqueness and includes an alternative or advocacy statement.

== Negative ==
In policy debate, the Negative (NEG) is the team which negates the resolution and contends with the Affirmative team (AFF).

The Negative team speaks second and second to last.

== Negative block ==
In policy debate, the negative block refers to the second negative constructive (2NC) and the first negative rebuttal (1NR). Although the two speeches are divided by a three-minute cross-examination of the 2NC, they are given back to back without the interruption of an affirmative speech. This is purposely arranged in academic policy debate to give the Affirmative the benefit of having the first and last speech.

Almost universally, Negative teams will "split the block" by dividing the arguments between their speeches to avoid repeating themselves. Usually, the division will be based on flows, but sometimes based on second affirmative constructive (2AC) arguments if there is a more compelling reason to divide arguments on flows. Often the 2NC and 1NR will go for different "worlds" of arguments, enabling the 2NR to go for only 2NC or only 1NR arguments, if the opportunity presents itself.

Because the 1NR has the ability to answer arguments which were dropped by the 2NC, the cross-examination of the 2NC will generally not emphasize dropped arguments. Also, because the cross-examination provides de facto preparation time to the 1NR, some debaters will end the cross-examination early if they have no important questions to ask.

== Off-case arguments ==
Off-case arguments, sometimes called On-Plan arguments are policy debate arguments presented by the negative in the 1NC. They are generally flowed on a separate sheet of paper each and read before case arguments.

They are so named because they are not directly responsive to the arguments made by the 1AC and are considered the "substance" of the 1NC.

Topicality, although a stock issue, is universally considered an off-case argument, because it deals directly with the plan text rather than the evidence behind it.

== Monolithic Plan ==
In policy debate, a plan inclusive counterplan is a counterplan that is monolithic and is presented by the negative team, which incorporates some of the affirmative's plan either functionally or substantively. Most judges consider monolithic plans theoretically legitimate although it is possible for the affirmative to defeat them on the grounds that they are illegitimate. Because they moot much of the 1AC contentions, they are considered one of the most potent negative strategies.

An affirmative monolithic plan tends to foreclose negative counterplans. For example, on a military topic, it is highly unlikely that there can be a viable nonmilitary counterplan alone that would not include the military, which would already be advocated by the affirmative. A negative team advocating a counterplan of diplomatic solvency only is not likely to capture military solvency.

An agent counterplan which proposes to do the affirmative plan with a different agent, and exclusionary counterplans which exclude part of the affirmative plan, are not monolithic but segmented or incremental. For example, if the affirmative plan was to "Pass the farm bill" a segmented plan would be to "Pass parts A and B of the farm bill".

== Preparation time ==
In policy debate, preparation time (prep time) is the amount of time given to each team to prepare for their speeches. Prep time may be taken at any time in any interval. Another form of prep time is known as alternate-use time. Alternate use time replaces preparation time and cross-examination. Alternate use time can be used for cross-examination or preparation in any amount the team desires at any time during the speech. Generally tournaments using alternate use time will have more time than tournaments using preparation time because it is used for both cross examination and preparation.

Although preparation time varies from tournament to tournament, in high school each team is generally given between 5 and 8 minutes of prep time depending on the state and tournament; in college, each team is generally given 10 minutes of prep time. At some collegiate tournaments, for example the University of Texas at Dallas, alternate use time is used giving the debaters a total of 16 minutes and eliminating the mandatory cross examination periods. This time can be used as preparation time or to ask questions during the normal cross examination periods.

Some judges will allow the team taking preparation time to continue asking questions of their opponent. However, because most judges will not require the other team to answer, these questions are generally clarification oriented rather than combative, unlike those asked in cross-examination. Many judges disapprove of using alternate use time for non-alternate use activities, for example asking questions of the other team or presenting more arguments.

== Rebuttal speech ==
In policy debate, the rebuttal speeches are the last four speeches. Unlike the constructive speeches, rebuttal speeches are not followed by a cross-examination period.

In high school, rebuttals are usually five minutes long (with the exception of certain states and organizations that use four minute rebuttals). In college debate, they are generally six minutes.

Rebuttal speeches must address arguments made in the constructive speeches. They generally may not propose new arguments or recover arguments dropped in a team's previous speeches. Teams breaking from this precedent are often met by claims of abuse from opponents.

== Resolution ==
In policy debate, a resolution or topic is a normative statement which the affirmative team affirms and the negative team negates. Resolutions are selected annually by affiliated schools.

At the college level, a number of topics are proposed and interested parties write 'topic papers' discussing the pros and cons of that individual topic. Once a topic is chosen, it is debated by affiliated students nationally for the entire season. The resolution typically is related to a course of policy pursued by the federal government.

== Significance ==
Significance is a stock issue in policy debate which establishes the importance of the harms in the status quo. As a stock issue has fallen out of favor with the debate community almost all debaters and judges now believe that any plan which is preferable to the status quo is significant.

However, there are known flaws in otherwise adequate theories of debate that sees Significance as eternally coupled with Harms, which is untrue. In values debate, a "Significance" is a judgment about any crucial aspect of the team's debate outline, and Topicality is secondary to the Stock Issues. Significance goes toward Solvency and is weighed against Inherency, not Harms, that there is unknown danger in change (for example, from deterrence to deproliferation). In that way, the "benevolent debate" is preferred, giving good standing to the Affirmative, and so "any plan that is preferable to the status quo is significant", which is a misunderstanding, better considered as "any plan that is preferable to the status quo is unique", with very few exceptions. But it also exposes the Affirmative to diminution of good standing, in which the Negative counterplan can win on Solvency by being better than unique - as a matter of Significance - plus the Affirmative accumulates Harms by not knowing what they were doing, and that is what makes the Negative counterplan Solvency significant and unique, not because the Harms are unique but because the Harms are less significantly unique overall after Solvency, and that is not an equivocation of words but a debate policy theory about the inherent harms in change, the harms in tinkering or focusing on minutiae or offering incrementalism in a plan. That is, the better understanding about Significance is significant, is better debate theory.

For example, the Solvency that is bigger than the status quo Harms starts from the presumption that "small things have big impacts, such as a suitcase plutonium dirty bomb". Unlike most plans that add something to the status quo's affairs, nuclear weapons are a threat merely by their existence, but the ontological completeness of the Solvency to get rid of the dirty bomb, going beyond deterring use of the bomb, is of greater Significance. In Push Debate, the Harms in the status quo has a huge impact potential but not currently, which makes the plan opportune and worthwhile: they have to avoid the Inherent harms as all-or-nothing. Conversely, in debate from Vying, Significance helps debaters consider a resolution topic more meaningfully and not only about plans. A "dirty, cheap" Harm such as a single microchip in a spy satellite has greater impact currently than its removal, in which the Solvency seems so insignificant. However, the sheer amount of work and money in vying for preserving the status quo is the all-for-nothing Harms, and to make the removable of the spy satellite microchip seem insignificant with respect to the status quo makes the plan Solvency highly unique, highly significant, the "QED - quite easily done" simple task. The more delay on Solvency, the more the Harms grow while appearing insignificant. Successful removable, as Solvency, is everything.

To some debaters, Significance derives from the word "substantially", which appears in most resolutions, and one can argue that Significance has been subsumed by the option for the Negative team to argue nontopicality on that word against the Affirmative team, then the Negative would lose on the stricture against permuting. In Push Debate, topicality does not need extraordinary defense nor flimsy probing, and the traditional stock issue Significance is preserved if nothing could be done about Inherency that would be nontopical. The difference is between saying "our plan is significantly (or substantially) topical because it is a specific implementation of the resolution", which does not mean much other than it is minimal in terms of Grounding, and "our plan's solvency is significant (or substantial)", which is what judges are looking for about plans and the resolution in the "benevolent debate" that is not bogged down in wordiness.

== Solvency ==
Solvency is a stock issue in policy debate, referring to the effectiveness of the affirmative plan or the negative counterplan in solving the harms or problems of the status quo. A good solvency mechanism will have a solvency advocate: a qualified professional or credible expert specifically advocating the proposed course of work, who are cited by the debaters. After the First Affirmative Constructive speech (1AC), it is assumed that the Affirmative team can completely solve all of their harms unless the speaker did not complete Solvency. Solvency can be reduced or undermined by certain arguments, e.g. corruption will prevent the plan from being implemented to the extent necessary to completely solve the harms. A disadvantage argument (as opposed to an advantage argument) might change from one stock issue to solvency, one of which could be a Disadvantage, No Link between plan and Solvency, and many more arguments. If the Negative team can prove that the effects of the plan make the harms worse than they are in the current situation, then the Affirmative team cannot guarantee positive benefits and therefore no reason exists as to why the plan should be adopted. That is so because the stock issue of Inherency prefers to give weight to the status quo, in which a plan disadvantage that is no better or worse than the status quo would be a waste of time compared to not changing the status quo.

== Straight turns ==
A disadvantage (or advantage) is said to be straight-turned when the responding team has answered an argument only with turns and with no defensive argument.

For example: If the affirmative link turned the economy disadvantage above but also argued that economic collapse did not lead to war, the negative could "kick" the disadvantage by granting the impact take-out to eliminate the risk of a turn.

A common negative mistake is to grant a non-uniqueness argument to kick a link turned disadvantage. Since non-uniqueness arguments are critical components of link turns, a disadvantage with only non-unique and link turn responses is actually straight turned.

== Topicality ==
Topicality is a stock issue in policy debate which pertains to whether or not the plan affirms the resolution as worded. To contest the topicality of the affirmative, the negative interprets a word or words in the resolution and argues that the affirmative does not meet that definition, that the interpretation is preferable, and that non-topicality should be a voting issue.

== Turn ==
In policy debate, a turn is an argument that proves an argument the other side has made actually supports one's own side. This is as opposed to a takeout or nonjustfication, which merely argues that the argument the other team has made is wrong. The turn can be used against practically any argument that includes a link and impact (or something equivalent), including disadvantages, kritiks, and advantages to the affirmative case.

For example, if the Negative said "The plan increases poverty," the Affirmative could turn with "the plan decreases poverty" or takeout by proving the plan didn't increase poverty.

There are many, many types of turns:

- Turn the Link (we turn their link argument)
- Turn the Impact (we turn their impact argument)
- Turn the Uniqueness (we turn their uniqueness argument)
- Turn Topicality, not even resolutional (we turn their purpose, they will never reach their solvency, their plan is a nonstarter)
- Turn the Typicality, too generic (we turn their plan's Typicality argument against their Solvency uniqueness)
- Turn the Significance (we turn their significance argument)
- Turn the authority cited (we turn the same authority they cited, who said something else supporting our side exclusively)
- Turn the chain (we turn their janga syllogism of linked, interdependent series of arguments)
- Turn the diseconomics (we turn the equity part of their solvency)
- Turn the Justification (we turn their Justification)

The reason why, for example, "Turn the Link" is preferred speech over saying "Link Turn" is the work to be done in the argument prefaces the rationale, the middle argument to be argued or proven or presented, and moves the debate forward as a matter of understanding and separates whose argument is whose rather than assuming the movement of the debate is a mutual drag of constructed arguments, which it is not. The manner of preferred speech avoids getting bogged down in relying too much on the flowsheet, even though saying "Link Turn" is more concise.

A pocket turn, although not an oft-cited in-round debate practice, is an advanced technique that wagers the other side will lose resources comparatively, on comparable or noncomparable resources. An Affirmative Pocket Turn gets a boost in solvency, or captured advantage, at least over the status quo without any thought to the Negative. If the Affirmative is running a plan to save lives, and there are X number of dying persons in the status quo, the Negative's unwillingness to challenge the Affirmative's plan solvency directly is a pocket turn for the Affirmative, the Negative achieving some other goal that is considered not a comparable turn on Affirmative's Solvency, which is implementing the resolution. For example, if the Negative saves trillions of trees (by increasing employment) for later generations but more and more persons are dying of disease right now, the Affirmative plan to save many people (by increasing affordable physical exercise) who can later plant trees, would easily win. A pocket turn can win on arguing whose priority is more advantageous even if both sides win their plans independently. Likewise with comparable resources, an Affirmative plan that touts spending now is better than relying on credit loans later can achieve advantages over the status quo and even over the Negative plan.

== Kritik Affimative ==
A K aff (short for kritikal affirmative) is a type of affirmative case in competitive policy debate that, rather than defending a hypothetical government action under the resolution, advances a critical argument drawn from philosophy, political theory, or cultural studies. The term derives from kritik (the German spelling of "critique"), which refers to an argument that challenges the assumptions, language, or ideology underlying an opposing position.

In traditional policy debate, the affirmative team presents a plan, usually an action by the United States federal government, and argues that it would produce advantages over the status quo. A K aff departs from this model. It may criticize the resolution itself, question the debate community's norms, or advocate for a different approach to the topic, such as a performance, personal narrative, or an alternative way of engaging with the issue. K affs are often described as non-topical or non-resolutional when they do not defend the resolution's implementation. Common source literature includes critical race theory, feminist theory, Afro-pessimism, queer theory, postmodernism, and settler colonialism studies.

K affs became increasingly common in American collegiate policy debate in the 1990s and have since spread to high school debate. Their use is contested. Critics argue that K affs undermine fairness and predictability by making it difficult for the negative team to prepare, and that debating a specific policy topic builds valuable research and advocacy skills. Supporters argue that K affs expand the educational value of debate, allow participants to address issues relevant to their own experiences, and challenge exclusionary practices within the activity. Negative teams typically respond with procedural arguments such as topicality or framework (often called "T-USFG"), or with counterarguments about the case's merits.
