= Louisville Project =

The Louisville Project was a project by the University of Louisville's policy debate team (the University of Louisville Debate Society or ULDS) to increase meaningful minority participation in debate, which started in 2000.

Led by Coach Ede Warner, the Louisville Project eschewed traditional forms of debating like speed reading, debating the resolution, and presenting traditional forms of evidence. The project instead used hip hop music, personal experiences, and other media to present their arguments. They argued that many elements of policy debate are exclusionary and thus limit diversity in debate.

== History ==
In 2005, Louisville started a "Take it to the Streets" initiative in which they offered to debate the topic normally if the judge was replaced with a layperson. Because of the time required to find a new critic, the rounds were to take place with reduced speech times, approximately equivalent to those of Lincoln-Douglas debate. Most teams accepted the agreement and Louisville lost the vast majority of those debates.

In November 2005, Ede Warner announced, on the collegiate debate message board eDebate, his resignation as the Cross Examination Debate Association (CEDA) 2nd vice president, canceled the University of Louisville's debate tournament (the "Super Bowl of Debate"), and announced his plans to stop recruiting debaters and retire in 5 years. This is regarded by many in the debate community as the beginning of the end of the Louisville Project.

Louisville continued "The Project" through the 2006–2007 season and became self-titled as the MPOWER (Multi-cultural policy organizing with emancipatory rhetoric) Movement. The MPOWER Movement sought to implement policies into the debate community that would enhance multi-cultural education in collegiate debate. Louisville advocated a 10-demand plan which was distributed to the debate community during the 2006–07 season at competitions. The team used these points to support their argument that collegiate debate is currently exclusive of minority groups based on race, economics, gender, sexuality and communicative differences. They were crucial to the growth of the kritik & performance debate. The success of the Louisville team fluctuated during the 2006–07 season. In the end, two teams qualified for elimination rounds at CEDA Nationals where two members also received speaking awards.

== Legacy ==
Other colleges continued the mission of the project in various ways. Using techniques pioneered by Louisville, in 2013 Emporia State University's Ryan Wash and Elijah Smith won both the National Debate Tournament and the Cross Examination Debate Association tournament.

== In media ==
- Louisville was featured prominently in the National Debate Tournament documentary on CBS College Sports Network.
- The 2007 HBO Documentary Resolved featured a team from Jordan High School that competed using the ideals of The Project.

== See also ==
- Hip-hop in academia
