= Policy debate competitions in the United States =

Policy debate competitions in the United States are organized at both the high school and college levels, with tournaments taking place at local, regional, and national scales throughout the academic year. High school debaters typically compete in local tournaments on weekends during the debate season, with a smaller group of elite competitors traveling the country on what is known as the national circuit. The premier high school championship is the Tournament of Champions, held at the University of Kentucky, while non-national-circuit debaters compete through organizations such as the National Forensic League and the NCFCA. At the college level, tournaments run from September through late March, with the National Debate Tournament (NDT), the Cross Examination Debate Association (CEDA), and the American Debate Association (ADA) each hosting their own national championships.

== High School Tournaments ==
Most high school debaters debate in local tournaments in their city, state or nearby states. Hundreds of such tournaments are held at high schools throughout the US each weekend during the debate season.

=== Structure ===
Tournaments at the high school level often include individual, or speech events, in addition to debate. Many debaters choose to compete in both speech and debate events. These events vary based on the tournament and its sponsoring agency. A typical tournament is spread over two days, and usually occurs on the weekend (Friday-Saturday)

Day one is usually reserved for speech events and preliminary debate rounds. The number of preliminary rounds varies from tournament to tournament, ranging from only three rounds up to eight at the largest of tournaments. The preliminaries of speech are often concluded during this time. In some cases the events alternate with one round of speech, then one round of debate and so on. Day two is usually reserved with the "out-rounds"(more commonly referred to as “elimination rounds”) of the tournament, in which those that qualified (based on pre-elimination records) will compete in elimination rounds.

=== Breaking into Out-Rounds ===
Also known as "clearing", debaters are scored based upon their own win–loss record, speaking ability, and the win–loss record of the teams they faced. To first decide who qualifies, win–loss record is used, then moving down the list to break ties. The winners are seeded into a bracket that is either "power-protected" or "power-matched". For example, in a power-protect tournament, the highest seed will debate the lowest seed, and in a power-matched tournament, the high seed will debate the high seed. At most tournaments the out-rounds will start at the octo-final level, although at large tournaments out-rounds may begin at the double or even triple octo-final level and some very small local tournaments could break to Quarterfinals, or in extremely small tournaments Semifinals. These rounds are commonly adjudicated with a panel of three or more judges. The siding of the debate is often based on a coin flip, unless the two opposing teams had debated one another earlier in the tournament.

=== Sweepstakes ===
Each school will fill an entry with speakers and debaters to qualify for the sweepstakes award, in which the collective achievements of the teams are compared to decide which school will win that tournament. Points are awarded for debaters and speakers who break into out-rounds, with the higher points awarded for finalists. During the tabulation of the tournament, a winner is decided and awarded during the Awards Ceremony at the conclusion of the tournament.

=== National Circuit ===
A small subset of high school debaters, mostly from elite public and private schools, travel around the country to tournaments in what is called the 'national circuit.' Major national circuit tournaments include the Glenbrooks at Glenbrook North and Glenbrook South High Schools in the North Shore area of Chicago, the Barkley Forum for High Schools at Emory University, the Greenhill Fall Classic at Greenhill in Texas, the Berkeley Invitational at Berkeley in Northern California, and the St. Mark's Heart of Texas Invitational at St. Mark's School of Texas in Dallas, however there are seven major tournaments and about forty smaller national circuit tournaments. Colleges and university with policy debate programs at the collegiate level also often host tournaments for this circuit. Another elite form is the TOC (Tournament of Champions), in which qualification is required by winning bids from at least two large-scale, participating tournaments by advancing to a certain stage depending on the size of the tournament. The hardest tournaments award bids to octofinalists, and tournaments with smaller pools and lower levels of competition award bids to quarterfinalists, semifinalists, or finalists. About 70 teams of two from around the country qualify for the TOC every year.

=== High School Championship ===
The high school debate tournament generally considered to be the national circuit championship is the Tournament of Champions, held at the University of Kentucky. For debaters outside the national circuit, the national championship is determined by their sponsoring organization. The main such tournaments are the National Speech and Debate Tournament of the National Forensic League, the National Championship of the NCFCA, the Grand National Tournament of the National Catholic Forensic League, and the National Urban Debate Championship Tournament of the National Association of Urban Debate Leagues.

The largest high school debate tournament by entry is the Glenbrooks. Students in urban debate programs participate in tournaments sponsored by local urban debate leagues or by the National Association of Urban Debate Leagues, which annually hosts a national championship in Chicago. The National Debate Coaches' Association hosts an annual tournament at the end of the year, with a qualification process based on points achieved at various tournaments. This tournament is generally viewed as a precursor to the TOC, as the same teams generally qualify for both.

== College Tournaments ==
Inter-Collegiate policy debate has a scheduled list of tournaments through the season at both a regional and national scale. The season spans from September to the end of March and at times into the beginning of April. Colleges and universities host tournaments most weekends during this span of time.

=== Structure ===
Tournaments are hosted over a three-day period of time, in most instances. This can either be Friday-Sunday, or more often Saturday-Monday. The number of rounds per tournament ranges from 6-8 usually, although small regional tournaments may have fewer. The first two days of competition are when the preliminary rounds occur, possibly beginning the first out-round the second night. The final day of competition is reserved for out-rounds.

=== Breaking into Out-Rounds ===
The same system is used for determining who participates in elimination rounds at the college level, as at the high school level. It is common for tournaments to break to double octa-finals. The deliberation time for the judges in these elimination rounds is often lengthy, hence the need for a full day for the elimination rounds to be completed.

=== College National Championships ===
There is no single unified national championship in college debate; the National Debate Tournament (NDT), the Cross Examination Debate Association (CEDA) and the American Debate Association (ADA) all host national tournaments. There are also Junior Varsity and Novice national championship tournaments, as well as a national title for community colleges. The NDT is one of the most prestigious college tournaments. CSTV, a college sports network, produces a documentary of the NDT each year, showcasing top teams and highlights from the tournament.

== See also ==
- Debates
- Conversation
- Dialectics
- Public speaking

International high-school debating

- Heart of Europe Debating Tournament
- World Individual Debating and Public Speaking Championships
- World Schools Debating Championships
- National High School Debate League of China

International university debating

- Debate camp#Popular camps/institutes
- Australasian Intervarsity Debating Championships
- American Parliamentary Debate Association
- Canadian University Society for Intercollegiate Debate
- International Public Debate Association
- National Association of Urban Debate Leagues
- North American Debating Championship
- North American Public Speaking Championship
- World Universities Debating Championship
- World Universities Debating Championship in Spanish
