= Topicality (policy debate) =

Topicality is a resolution issue in policy debate which pertains to whether or not the plan affirms the resolution as worded. To contest the topicality of the affirmative, the negative interprets a word or words in the resolution and argues that the affirmative does not meet that definition, that the interpretation is preferable, and that non-topicality should be a voting issue. "Interpretation" is a low-level standard argued by high school debaters but not quibbled verbatim, "interpretation", by seasoned debaters beyond college. The difference is between what is said ("text") and what is allowed ("treaty" or "d'accord" or agreement or advocacy, etc.).

== Structure of Negative's Argument ==
An argument against the Affirmative's topicality, when presented in the 1NC, is generally as follows:

- Interpretation - Also known as "definition", interpretation of a word or words in the resolution, often supported by evidence. Evidence to support an interpretation can come from virtually "any" source (dictionary, legal dictionary, academic paper, laws, court rulings, etc.) and emphasis is placed on both the desirability of the interpretation and the quality of the evidence which supports the interpretation. In advanced debate, the rhetoric of agreement is referred to as the stasis (the weight, the balance) as opposed mere verbal jousting over poor diction that ought to have been eliminated already.
- Violation - Reason(s) why the plan does not meet the interpretation. Although "violation" is a traditional slang in the college debate community, the preferred "debatease" contention is said simply: "not true" or "false" or "does not meet" or "inadequate", etc. In pure form, it is said as "Contention", but some debaters say "does not fit", following debate protocol of the Politorg Fit stasis oratory in policy debate; they do not say "violate", which means something else and lacks debate etiquette.
- Standards - Reason(s) why the interpretation is superior.
- Voting Issue - Reason(s) why the judge should vote negative if the plan does not meet the interpretation.

== Commonly asserted standards / reasons to prefer ==
=== Nebel T ===
Nebel T is an argument regarding generic nouns such as generic bare plurals. There are two interpretations of the resolution: semantic and pragmatic. An argument is semantic if it appeals to what the resolution means. An argument is pragmatic if it appeals to the benefits of interpreting the resolution in some way.

This argument was proposed by Jake Nebel, an assistant professor of philosophy at University of Southern California. Nebel T has experienced a surge in popularity and is commonly used by Lincoln-Douglas debaters on the national circuit.

=== Predictable limits ===
Limits are a measure of how many cases would be topical under a given interpretation of the topic and whether that cleavage of cases is predictable. Teams will often debate the desirability of having a small or large number of topical cases.

=== Ground ===
Ground is a measure of the quantity and quality of arguments and literature available to both teams under a certain interpretation of the topic. Teams will often debate the desirability of incorporating or excluding certain arguments.

=== Brightline ===
Brightline (sometimes called precision) is a measure of how clear the division is between topical and non-topical cases under a certain interpretation.

=== Grammar ===
Grammar is a measure of how grammatically correct an interpretation is. Some teams argue that grammar is key to the acceptability of an interpretation.

=== Education ===
An Education standard asserts that the negative's interpretation of the resolution focuses the debate down to the most important area(s) for learning. This involves explaining why the topics and discussions preserved by the negative's interpretation are more important to the affirmative case and cases under the counterinterpretation.

=== Effects (FX) Topicality ===
Effects topicality alleges that the Affirmative team is not topical in its direct plan, resolution or intent, but only arrives at alleviating the Harms introduced by the Affirmative team typically associated with the topic through a variety of internal links. An example might be a case under a topic about limiting the use or stockpiling of weapons of mass destruction that declares war on North Korea or Iran. The Negative team would argue that such a case would only possibly be topical if it could be proven beyond a doubt not only that Iran or North Korea had weapons of mass destruction but also if such a war did not increase global proliferation pressures or involve the eventual use of weapons of mass destruction or did not lead to looting of such stockpiles, all very tendentious assumptions.

Negative teams will typically argue that such plans drastically abuse the resolution (i.e. allow too wide of a variety of cases to be run). Any case or plan could fall under the topic if enough causal links are allowed, and in raising a Topicality dispute, the Negative team states topicality should be decided based on a strict reading of the Affirmative plan (whether or not it takes the stock issue of solvency into account). Affirmative teams will either argue that they are not effectual, that the plan's mandate directly falls under the rubric of the topic (though they may continue to claim remote advantages not typically associated with topical cases), or that effects topicality is acceptable.

=== Extra-Topicality ===
Extra-topicality is sometimes run in conjunction with FX, sometimes separately. The argument is that the Affirmative plan includes "planks" or components that are not topical. For example, a plan under an energy-conservation topic might both sign the Kyoto Protocol and increase general science funding across the board, obviously including energy conservation. Such a plan might then argue for environmental, economic or military benefits separate from anything having to do with energy conservation. A Negative team would argue that this would be extra-topical because the plan is acting in areas that are outside the boundaries of the resolution (therefore, "extra"-topicality). Either seriously or as an example, sometimes Negatives running against FX and Extra cases will run counterplans that they argue would be the truly topical version of the Affirmative plan: For example, the Negative in the above case could run a counterplan wherein they only sign Kyoto. Negative teams will argue that the whole plan's mandate must be topical, as otherwise every Affirmative could run a different permutation of topical and non-topical components and make the topic literally unlimited. Affirmative teams will either argue that extra-topicality is legitimate or, much more frequently, that all components of their plan are in fact topical. A plan can arguably be extra-topical, not topical and FX-topical all at once: Its arguably topical plank may both not be topical no matter the causal links and rely on causal links to get to its arguable topicality, as well as having non-topical planks.

== Commonly asserted voting issues ==
=== Competing Interpretations ===
Under the competing interpretations framework, if the negative presents a better interpretation than the affirmative's (which the affirmative does not meet), the negative wins. In other words, the affirmative's burden is to meet the best interpretation in the round. The usual affirmative answer is "reasonability", that is, that if the affirmative meets a good definition of the topic, the affirmative wins the debate, even if it isn't the best definition of the topic. In other words, the affirmative's burden is to meet some interpretation in the round that is sufficiently good.

=== Fairness ===
Some teams argue that it is unfair for the negative to have to debate a non-topical case and thus the judge should vote against one. This voting issue is sometimes referred to as "competitive equity."

=== Education ===
Some Negative teams argue that non-topical cases decrease the educational factor of a round.

=== Jurisdiction ===
Some teams argue that the judge only has the jurisdiction to vote for cases which affirm the resolution. This justification has largely fallen out of favor in collegiate debate after the 2001-2002 Native Americans topic led to large numbers of kritiks about how it was the issue and mindset of jurisdiction that destroyed Native American culture.

== Affirmative answers to Topicality ==
Affirmatives can deploy a variety of answers to topicality violations in the 2AC. They can be generally categorized as follows:

- We Meet - The affirmative can reaffirm that their case meets the negative's interpretation, even ontological in terms of axiology as "good" or "accepted valuable enough", and that strict ontology assumes only antiblackness is topical, which is reduction to absurdity.
- Counter-interpretation - The affirmative can offer a different interpretation of the word or words that the negative defined. The affirmative will usually argue that their interpretation is superior using the same standards outlined above, they can either use the standards that the negative used or present counterstandards.
- Non-voter - The affirmative can argue that the judge shouldn't vote negative even if they don't meet the negative's interpretation. This argument may be phrased as "reasonability", that the judge should accept the affirmative's case if it meets a reasonable interpretation of the resolution.
- Fair Grounds - The affirmative can reaffirm that while the affirmative sets the direction of the debate by being topical, it is only fair that the negative, which does not have to be topical, can explore the grounds and has many counter-resolution, nontopical cases they can run.
- Reverse Voting Issue (RVI) - The affirmative can claim that the topicality argument raised by the negative is abusive of the resolution, because the negative is not required to support the resolution, and so the affirmative's topicality justifies an affirmative ballot. Judges do not find a "blank abusive" argument very persuasive without giving good clash.
- Reasonability - The affirmative will argue that their plan does a "good enough" job of meeting the resolution and that it is unwarranted to reject them outright. They will argue that the negative has to prove that it has become impossible to prepare and argue against the affirmative's case. This is used to answer competing interpretations.
