= Impact calculus =

In policy and public forum debates, impact calculus, also known as weighing impacts, is a type of argumentation which seeks to compare the impacts presented in both causes and effects to sway the judge's decision.

== Basic Impact Calculus ==
There are several basic types of impact calculus that compare the impacts of the plan to the impacts of a disadvantage:

Probability (one impact is more realistic than the other)
e.g. Economic collapse is more seriously realistic than an outbreak of grey goo, therefore the risk of economic collapse outweighs the probability of a grey goo disaster. Probability has to have some substantial historical evidence beyond theory to move to precedence or initial risk already incurred.
Timeframe (one impact will happen sooner)
e.g. An asteroid impact will cause extinction before Global warming will, therefore an asteroid impact outweighs Global Warming.
Magnitude (one impact is bigger)
e.g. Nuclear war could kill more people instantly than car accidents cumulatively over a long period.
Severity (one impact is more causal)
e.g. Air pollution increasing illnesses matter more than a loss in a country's GDP because each sickness is more harmful than each loss of money. Because money is intrinsically derived from productivity that maintains or improves health, productivity is inherently much less during illnesses

== Other types of impact calculus ==
Some other more sophisticated arguments are also considered impact calculus:

Impact inclusivity (one impact is inclusive of the other)
e.g. Global war is inclusive of a Taiwan war, therefore global war outweighs Taiwan war.
Root Cause (one impact causes the other impact to happen)
e.g. War causes genocide, therefore war outweighs genocide
Internal link shortcircuiting (one impact prevents a (positive) impact from happening)
e.g. Nuclear war halts space colonization, therefore nuclear war outweighs space colonization
Reversibility
e.g. Civil liberties lost in the name of security during a time of crisis can be restored later, but deaths caused by a lack of security are irreversible.
Link Strength
e.g. Improbable double-dip recessions may be caused by enacting trade sanctions, but more solid arguments with better evidence should be considered more strongly. (This may be considered a type of Substantiability argument, where more firmly-established nontheoretic effects are more important.)

Approach arguments can also be considered impact calculus. Arguments as to why the judge should adopt a utilitarian or consequentialist perspective or conversely a deontological perspective may change the way they compare impacts.

== Impact calculus and "new" arguments ==
Basic impact calculus arguments may be made at any time and are generally not considered "new" arguments, even if brought up for the first time in the 2NR or 2AR. More sophisticated forms of impact calculus should generally be brought up earlier in the debate and supported by evidence whenever possible.
