= Most Likely to Succeed =

Most Likely to Succeed may refer to:

- Most Likely to Succeed (film), a 2015 American documentary
- Most Likely to Succeed, a 2007 album by Luckyiam

== See also ==
- The One Voted Most Likely to Succeed, a 1995 album by SNFU
