= Greg Whiteley =

American film director (born 1969)

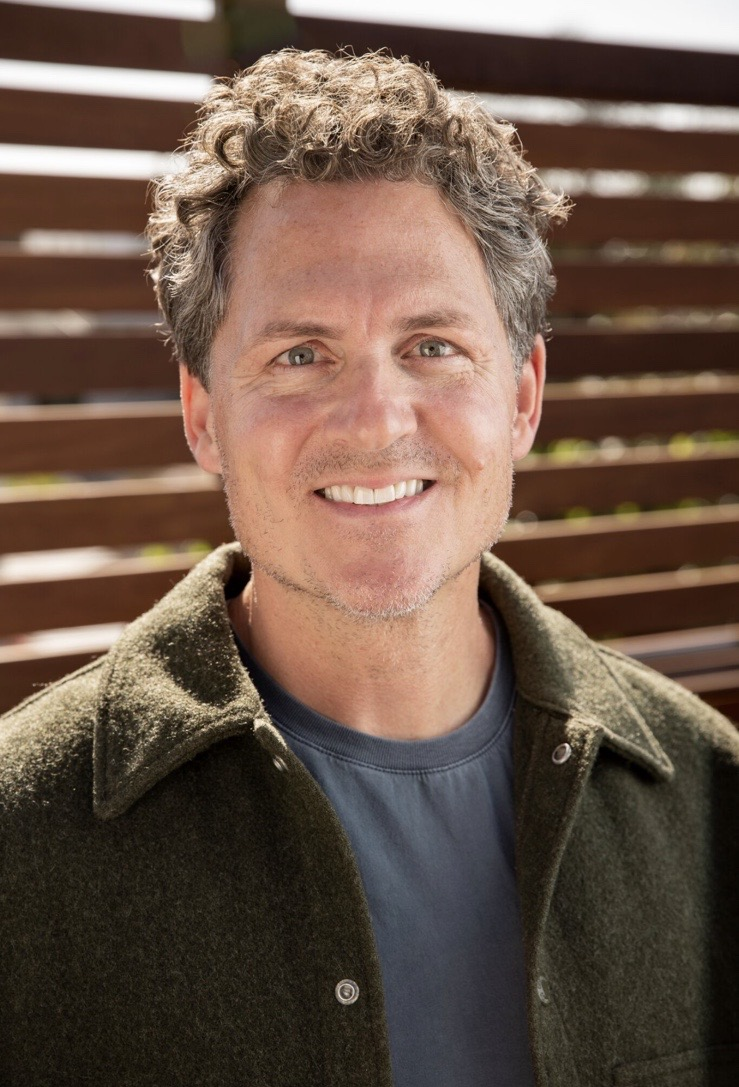
- Whiteley in 2019
- Born: November 11, 1969 (age 57); Provo, Utah, U.S.
- Education: Brigham Young University
- Occupations: Film director, producer, and writer
- Years active: 1999–present
- Spouse: Erin Jeanne Whiteley (m. 1999)
- Children: 2
- Website: onepotatoproductions.com

Greg Beck Whiteley (born November 11, 1969) is the creator, executive producer, and director of the Netflix documentary series The Clubhouse: A Season With the Red Sox (2025), America's Sweethearts: Dallas Cowboys Cheerleaders (2024), Wrestlers (2023), Cheer (2020–2022) and Last Chance U (2016–2020). His films include New York Doll (2005), Resolved (2007), Mitt (2014), and Most Likely to Succeed (2015).

Whiteley's documentaries have received two IDA awards, four Emmy Awards and had three premieres at the Sundance Film Festival in Park City, Utah.

== Background ==
Whiteley was born in Provo, Utah to Jessie and Kent Whiteley. He grew up in Bellevue, Washington where he attended Interlake High School and became a two-time debate state champion.

He served for two years, from 1989–1991, as a missionary for the Church of Jesus Christ of Latter-day Saints to the Navajo Nation in New Mexico. He graduated from Brigham Young University in Provo in 1995 with a BA in film and received an MFA in film from Art Center College of Design in Pasadena, California in 2001.

== Career ==
After winning two Clio Awards during graduate school at Art Center, he was hired by Populuxe Pictures to direct commercials. From 1996 to 2000, Whiteley served as the head of Film Actors Theater in Los Angeles. While beginning work on New York Doll in 2005, he launched One Potato Productions with his wife, Erin. He named the company in an homage to his recently deceased father, who grew up on an Idaho potato farm.

Whiteley wrote, filmed, and directed New York Doll in 2005. The documentary explores the history of the punk rock band New York Dolls, focusing on the life of bassist Arthur Kane after he converts to the Church of Jesus Christ of Latter-day Saints. Whiteley created Resolved in 2006, which follows the story of a high school debate team. From 2006 to 2012 he filmed Mitt, having gained access to the Romney family, though not his campaign staff, during both of governor Mitt Romney's campaigns for the United States presidency. From 2012 to 2014, he created Most Likely To Succeed, which is about the education system in the United States and proposes ideas for its reform.

From 2016 onwards, he worked on various sports docuseries for Netflix. Last Chance U (2016–2020) followed football players at junior colleges attempting to move to a Division I NCAA program and ultimately to the NFL. A basketball spin-off, Last Chance U: Basketball (2021-present) soon followed. Cheer (2020–2022) examines Navarro College's cheer team, a community college team in rural Corsicana which is northeast of Waco, Texas. The cheer team were 14-time NCA National Collegiate Champions. Wrestlers (2023) follows Ohio Valley Wrestling headquartered in Louisville, Kentucky. His most recent work, America's Sweethearts: Dallas Cowboys Cheerleaders (2024) premiered on Netflix on 20th June 2024.

== Personal life ==
Whiteley married Erin Bybee in 1999. The couple lives in Laguna Beach, California with their son, Henry, and daughter, Scout.

== Filmography ==
- New York Doll (2005)
- Resolved (2007)
- Mitt (2014)
- Most Likely to Succeed (2015)
- Last Chance U (2016–2020)
- Cheer (2020–2022)
- Last Chance U: Basketball (2021)
- Wrestlers (2023–present)
- America's Sweethearts: Dallas Cowboys Cheerleaders (2024-present)
- The Clubhouse: A Year With the Boston Red Sox (2025)

== Awards and honors ==
- 1999 Clio Student Awards: Pepsi and Krazy Glue
- 2005 nomination, Satellite Award: New York Doll (2005)
- 2005 nomination, Grand Jury Prize at the Sundance Film Festival: New York Doll (2005)
- 2007 Audience Award, Best Documentary at the Los Angeles Film Festival: Resolved (2007)
- 2009 nomination, Emmy Award for Best Documentary: Resolved (2007)
- 2009 nomination, Emmy Award for Editing: Resolved (2007)
- 2014 Opening Gala Film, Sundance Film Festival: Mitt (2014)
- 2016 Best Documentary Series, International Documentary Association: Last Chance U (2016)
- 2020 Best Nonfiction Sports Documentary Series, Realscreen Award: Last Chance U (2019)
- 2020 Emmy Award for Outstanding Serialized Sports Documentary : Last Chance U (2020)
- 2020 Emmy Award for Outstanding Unstructured Reality Program: Cheer (2020)
- 2020 Emmy Award for Outstanding Directing for a Reality Program: Cheer (2020)
- 2021 IDA Award for Best Episodic Series: Last Chance U (2020)
