= Mitt (film) =

2014 film by Greg Whiteley

- Directed by: Greg Whiteley
- Written by: Greg Whiteley
- Produced by: Adam Leibowitz; Greg Whiteley
- Starring: Mitt Romney
- Cinematography: Greg Whiteley
- Edited by: Adam Ridley; Greg Whiteley
- Music by: Perrin Cloutier
- Production companies: Exhibit A Pictures; One Potato Productions
- Distributed by: Netflix
- Release date: January 17, 2014 (Sundance Film Festival)
- Running time: 92 minutes
- Country: United States
- Language: English

Mitt is a 2014 American documentary film that chronicles the 2008 and 2012 presidential campaigns of former Massachusetts governor Mitt Romney. Mitt premiered at the Sundance Film Festival on January 17, 2014. The film was released on Netflix on January 24, 2014.

== Background ==
Director Greg Whiteley is an admirer of Mitt Romney's father George. He was further interested in filming Romney when he heard that Romney had attended a screening of his film New York Doll and was planning to run for president. Whiteley then approached Tagg Romney about making a documentary about his father's presidential bid. Mitt Romney was at first resistant to the idea of a documentary, but his wife Ann liked the idea. Although Whiteley had initially planned to only cover the 2008 election, he eventually ended up filming over a period of six years.

== Synopsis ==
In 2006, Mitt Romney decides to run for president of the United States. During the 2008 Republican presidential primaries, he seeks to win debates against John McCain and the other Republican Party presidential candidates. After he loses the Republican nomination, he returns in 2012 to challenge incumbent Barack Obama for the White House. Meanwhile, his wife is diagnosed with multiple sclerosis, and he worries about disappointing his supporters and family if he loses.

== Reception ==
Mitt received mainly positive reviews from critics. The film holds a 64/100 on Metacritic, and aggregate site Rotten Tomatoes reports 83% approval.
