= Hip-hop in academia =

Systematic scientific and interdisciplinary study of hip hop

Hip hop studies is a multidisciplinary field of study that encompasses sociology, anthropology, communication and rhetoric studies, religious studies, cultural studies, critical race theory, missiological studies, art history, dance, musicology, ethnomusicology, music theory, and gender studies. The term "hip hop studies" began circulating in the mid-2000s, and though it is not clear who first coined the term to label the field, the field of hip hop studies is often cited as having been crystallized by the publication of That's the Joint!: The Hip Hop Studies Reader in 2003. That's the Joint! includes approximately 25 years of scholarship, criticism, and journalism. The publication of this anthology was unprecedented, and highlights the evolving and continuous influence of "one of the most creative and contested elements of global popular culture since its advent in the late 1970s." The publication of the first edition of That's the Joint! marked a consolidating moment for the field of hip hop studies because it brought together key writings on hip hop from a diversity of hip hop authorities.

Hip hop culture, rooted in the 1970s post-industrial South Bronx, is polyvocal and is represented in five cultural modes: rap music (oral), turntablism or "DJing" (aural), breaking (physical), graffiti art (visual), and knowledge (mental). Hip hop has, and continues to produce a remarkable array of thinkers who embody complex ideological makeups exemplified through their performances as writers, artists, poets, and scholars. In Hip Hop Matters (2005), professor and media scholar S. Craig Watkins labels the increasing interdisciplinary cohort of hip hop academics and scholars as the "hip-hop intelligentsia," and suggests that while this group of individuals may not often been discussed as an entity in and of itself, their existence is, without question, one of the greatest achievements of the hip hop movement. Watkins writes:

"The growing array of hip-hop intellectuals is a spectacular indication of the movement's multifaceted demeanor and ceaseless energy...What has emerged is a body of thinkers who articulate a wide range of ideas that, in their unique way, map out the contradictory currents, ideas, and worldview that percolate throughout the phenomenal world of hip hop. From spoken-word artists to academic scholars hip-hop intellectuals are translating the movement into a vast mix of critical commentary and artistic expression. The results both energize and expand the image and imagination of the hip-hop intelligentsia."

Hip hop studies is part of the larger hip hop movement. The research and teaching in this interdisciplinary field includes analyses of technology, pop culture, linguistics, globalization, geography, race, electoral politics, and a variety of aspects related to contemporary culture, as scholars attempt to critically assess hip hop as a movement. Scholarship in hip hop studies is rooted in the foundational, Afro-diasporic call-and-response mechanism within hip hop culture.

== Methodologies ==
The methodologies of examining hip hop are borrowed from sociology, politics, religion, economics, urban studies, journalism, communications theory, American studies, transatlantic studies, black studies, history, musicology, comparative literature, English, linguistics, and other disciplines.

— Michael Eric Dyson, Know What I Mean?: Reflections on Hip-Hop(2007)

Hip hop studies' methodologies, or methods of systematic inquiry and analysis, are drawn from a range of academic disciplines including anthropology, sociology, political science, history, linguistics, economics, performance studies, media and communicative studies, American studies, musicology, English and literature, women's and gender studies, and black studies. Greg Dimitriadis, formerly a professor in the Graduate School of Education at the University of Buffalo, was an academic who critically examined, amongst other topics, hip hop methodologies; writing "Questions of method are, at heart, questions about how one can best understand the world." In hip hop studies, this "world" encompasses the complexities of political, social, and economic exploitation of marginalized peoples, and hip hop practitioners' resultant forms of resistant expression, thus the frames of analysis used by scholars are equally complex and consider factors such as race, class, gender, gender identity, sexuality, location, and performance and performativity. The use of ethnography is popular and preferred in hip hop studies because it is a mode of inquiry that enables a scholar to include a multiplicity of voices, and showcases the experiential knowledges of hip hop doers and consumers; ideally this method highlights the dual authority of practitioners' and academics' knowledges.

== Foundational texts ==
Hip Hop studies has been growing as an academic discipline since the mid-1990s; two decades after its genesis. By the millennium and in the early 2000s, scholars such as Tricia Rose, Michael Eric Dyson, Cornel West, Anthony B. Pinn, Jeff Chang, Nelson George, Bakari Kitwana, Mark Anthony Neal, and Murray Forman, began to engage Hip Hop's history, messages of resistance, social cognizance, personal awareness, political activism, pleasure and power, and community engagement in scholarly works that gave Hip Hop academic legitimacy. Works by these authors are considered foundational texts in the field of Hip Hop studies because their research and publication served to legitimize Hip Hop as serious academic discipline. Since 2002 scholarly content centralizing around Hip Hop culture has multiplied exponentially; exemplified by the inception of the Hip Hop Archive & Research Institute at Harvard in 2002, and the publication of the second edition of That's the Joint!: The Hip Hop Studies Reader in 2011.

=== Tricia Rose's Black Noise: Rap Music and Black Culture in Contemporary America (1994) ===
Discussions of scholarly writing on hip hop in the academia often begin with Tricia Rose's Black Noise: Rap Music and Black Culture in Contemporary America, published in 1994. This book is categorized within hip hop studies as being among the most important early full-length texts on rap and hip hop culture, which helped to establish hip hop studies as a legitimate field of scholarly inquiry. Rose's book gives a comprehensive account of the evolutionary history of hip hop culture. In Rose's words, Black Noise "examines the complex and contradictory relationships between forces of racial and sexual domination, black cultural priorities, and popular resistance in contemporary rap music," while it outlines the social context of rap's existence. To achieve this analysis, Rose's includes a range of voices and perspectives by using an ethnographic approach; conducting interviews with hip hop performers and practitioners, as well as hip hop listeners and consumers. Rose's interviews were conducted throughout the United States, as well as in Hong Kong, China, and Japan. Rose's groundbreaking work continues to be referenced as a foundational text by contemporary scholars because its detailed documentation of hip hop culture's revolution employs ethnography, cultural theory, urban history and historiography, as well as black feminist thought; culminating in an extensive bibliography.

=== Jeff Chang's Can't Stop, Won't Stop: A History of the Hip-Hop Generation (2005) ===
Jeff Chang's comprehensive examination of hip hop, Can't Stop, Won't Stop: A History of the Hip-Hop Generation, received the American Book Award after its publication in 2005 and is often cited by hip hop cultural critics, hip hop journalists, popular-culture scholars, and hip hop academics. Chang situates hip hop as "forged in the fires of the Bronx and Kingston, Jamaica," and suggests that "hip-hop has been a generation-defining global movement," shaped by the deindustrialization and globalization of the post-civil rights era. Chang's method of inquiry and analysis hybrids statistical, historical, and ethnographical data with a casual writing style that includes Chang's opinions, sections of extended dialogue, and interviews. Chang's central themes in this text are race, and the intersections of race in hip hop agendas/politics.

== College/university programs and degrees ==
Howard University, a historically black college, was the first to offer a Hip Hop-specific class to students in 1991. In the proceeding two decades, colleges across the United States have begun to offer a variety of courses specifically about Hip Hop culture; these include top-ranked universities, such as Harvard, Penn State, USC, UCLA, Stanford, Rice, Duke, Princeton, and NYU. Additionally, in 2012, the University of Arizona announced the implementation of a Hip Hop studies minor; the first of its kind in the country. While the University of Arizona's minor is the first interdisciplinary Hip Hop studies concentration of its kind, since 2009 at McNally Smith College of Music in St. Paul, Minnesota students can acquire a diploma in Hip Hop studies that focuses on Hip Hop music technique, music and audio production, and music industry economics and marketing. In 2013 Tiffin University in Ohio began offering a music performance degree for students with primary focus in emceeing and beatmaking. Starting in 2022–23, the London College of Music is offering a BA (Hons) degree in Hip Hop Performance and Production, combining study of MCing, DJing, producing, and recording Hip Hop. Apart from classes and degree programs, development in the field has also been marked by the proliferation of conferences (domestically and internationally), symposiums, the development of readers and anthological texts, the establishment of the Hip Hop Archive and Research Institute at Harvard—each characteristic of a growing interest in and engagement with Hip Hop culture in academic discourse. In 2017, the top three universities to study Hip Hop at were McNally Smith College of Music, North Carolina Central University, and University of Arizona.

== Critiques and critics ==
Hip Hop studies has not grown without critics, both within and outside the field. Davey D. (David Cook), a Bronx native and Hip Hop journalist, historian, adjunct professor, and community activist, has written and verbalized critiques of academic Hip Hop claiming that the narrow standards that define legitimate scholarly inquiry exclude individuals who do Hip Hop, in favor of published academics who may or may not have any lived or tangible connection to Hip Hop culture at all. In an article published by the San Francisco Globe in March 2007, Davey D. is quoted as saying: "You have an interesting phenomenon, where the 'hip-hop experts,' with university appointments attached to their name, have no credibility whatsoever in hip-hop circles. That, coupled with the fact that academia in a lot of places has always kept a distinct separation between what goes on in community and what happens on campus, is a source of tension."

Hip hop's complex foundations have fostered a divergence of opinion amongst scholars regarding how writing on hip hop culture should be done. Namely, this debate is centralized around questions of language, and for what audience(s) scholars should be writing to address: the academic and/or scholar, the dilettante, or the fan and/or self-self-proccalimed "hip hop head." Since approximately 1988, three categories of writing on hip hop culture have emerged: works by academics, works by journalists and cultural critics, and works by hip-hop devotees; critiques of hip hop studies include questions of which kind of writing is considered authentic or legitimate within the field, and the accessibility that outsiders, or non-academics, would have to those texts, both physically and comprehensively.

Despite these critiques, not all critics of Hip Hop studies are trying to point out the perceived flaws as ways to invalidate its place in academia. Hip Hop feminists and feminism offer critics of Hip Hop studies from a perspective which adds another facet to Hip Hop studies, one that not only involves but gives a platform and amplifies the voice of Black and Latinx women and the LGBTQ+ community as they face the most erasure in the world of Hip Hop studies, even though they were there from the very start. Published books such as Home Girls Make Some Noise: Hip Hop Feminism Anthology, is an anthology that features journals, poetry, and articles by both women of color and LGBTQ+ community which depict where Hip Hop began and the direction in which it very well may go.

== See also ==
- Hip-hop based education
- Louisville Project – use of hip hop in debate
