= Sunrise International Education =

Cross-border marketing and immersive media company

Sunrise International is a cross-border marketing and immersive media company with a specialization in VR/AR media production, event management, and cross-border marketing in Asia. It was founded in 2011 by Gavin Newton-Tanzer and David Weeks and was a member of the Columbia Startup Lab in 2014.

As a media and marketing company, Sunrise International advocates for international brands to directly advertise on local Chinese media channels, citing issues surrounding the Great Firewall of China as a reason for why local users cannot access international social media platforms like Facebook, Twitter, Google, and YouTube. The organization is occasionally quoted by international news outlets on various issues relating to VR/AR in China, cross-border e-commerce in China, education technology, and issues surrounding international student mobility. Early on in the COVID-19 pandemic, the company spoke on a number of occasions about the impact of the pandemic on international student mobility, as well as the potential post-COVID rebound of Chinese students studying overseas. Its VR/AR practice includes virtual 360 tours, augmented reality marketing activations, holographic display hardware, AR-based self-guided tours, and spatial web design.

Sunrise International is the local organizer of the Augmented World Expo (AWE) Asia, an annual virtual and augmented reality industry event that has been hosted in Singapore and various Chinese cities since 2015. The company also co-hosts the Washington International Education Conference.

The company was originally founded with a focus on experimental education and extracurricular learning division based in China. From 2012-2022, the company founded and operated the National High School Debate League of China (NHSDLC), the oldest and largest high school English-language debate league in China. NHSDLC competitions were often hosted in second and third tier cities in China, sending students to compete at international debate competitions hosted at Stanford, Harvard, the University of Pennsylvania, and the Asia Society. From 2012-2022, it also founded and operated a business case analysis league called the China Youth Business League, run in partnership with the Harvard Undergraduate Economics Association and the Wharton China Business Society.
