= Martha Diaz =

Colombian-American community organizer

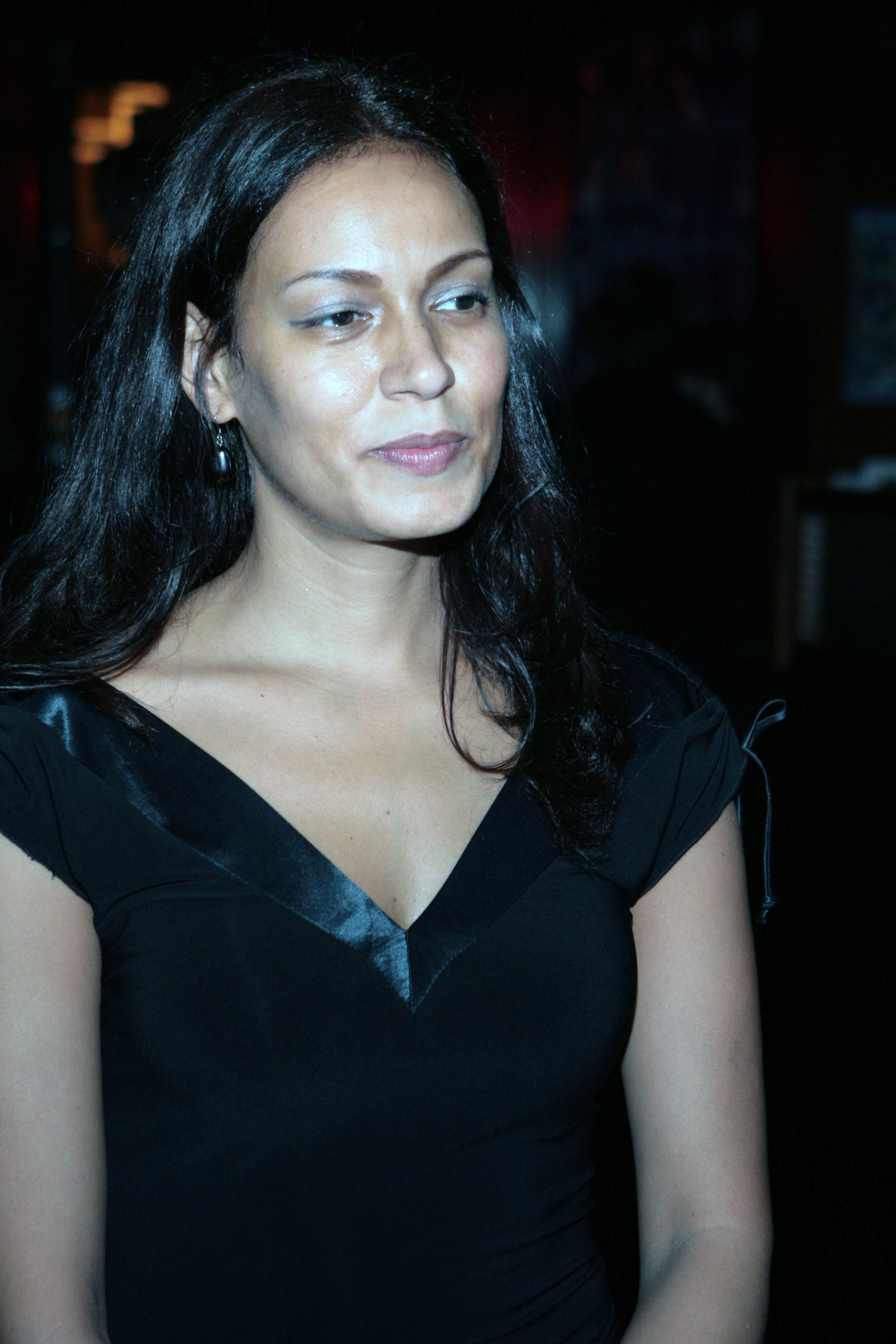
- Photographed by Terrance Jennings
- Born: 1969 (age 56–57)
- Education: New York University, Fairleigh Dickinson University
- Occupations: Founder/President, Hip-Hop Education Center
- Known for: Community Organizer, Media Producer, Archivist, Curator, Educator, Social Entrepreneur

Martha Diaz is a Colombian-American community organizer, media producer, archivist, curator, and social entrepreneur.

== Education ==
Diaz earned a Bachelor of Arts in Communications, with a minor in Television and Film Production from Fairleigh Dickinson University. She later completed a Master of Arts in Hip-Hop for Social Change at the Gallatin School of Individualized Study at New York University, followed by a Master of Arts in Moving Image Archiving and Preservation from NYU Tisch School of the Arts.

== Career ==
Diaz began her career as an intern working for Ted Demme on the cable show Yo! MTV Raps. She later served as an associate producer on several documentary films, including Black August, directed by Dream Hampton; Where My Ladies At?, directed by Leba Haber-Rubinoff; and Nas: Time Is Illmatic, directed by One9. In 2002, Diaz founded the H2O (Hip-Hop Odyssey) International Film Festival with a group of filmmakers, entertainment industry professionals, activist, and artists.

Diaz later served as executive director of the Hip-Hop Association, a community building 501(c)(3) non-profit organization. During her tenure, the organization received a Union Square Arts Award, which recognizes leadership in arts-and-culture-based education and social change.

In 2012, Diaz was appointed by Dr. Khalil Muhammad as the first Hip-Hop Scholar-in-Residence at The Schomburg Center for Research in Black Culture, a research center of the New York Public Library. During her residency, she developed and curated the Hip-Hop 4.0 initiative from 2012 to 2014.

Diaz has also served as a guest curator at NJ Performing Arts Center, Museum of the Moving Image, Lincoln Center, and the Academy of Motion Pictures Arts and Sciences, where she curated the institution’s first Hip-Hop film series.

In collaboration with Marcella Runell Hall, Diaz co-edited Hip-Hop Education Guidebook: Volume 1, a collection of lesson plans and resources designed to support the integration of hip-hop into classroom curricula. The guidebook grew out of the Hip-Hop Education Summit, which Diaz founded and curated with Patricia Wang from 2003 to 2005.

In 2010, while a graduate student at New York University, she founded the Hip-Hop Education Center to formalize and unify the field of hip-hop based education under the auspices of Dr. Pedro Noguera and Dr. Edward Fergus. The Hip-Hop Education Center developed from the archives, lessons learned, and best practices established through the work of the Hip-Hop Association.

Diaz conducted the first national study on hip-hop education programs and initiatives at the NYU Metropolitan Center for Urban Education within New York University's Steinhardt School of Culture, Education, and Human Development.

From 2011 to 2015, Diaz was a part-time professor at New York University's Gallatin School.

Diaz was involved with the Universal Hip Hop Museum as an advisor and community partner beginning in 2015, and later worked with the institution from 2019 to 2023. During this period, she served as Chair of Archives, Curatorial, and Educational Affairs, contributing to the development of the museum’s exhibitions, educational programming, digital archive, and digital asset management system.

Since 2022, Diaz has been a Senior Producer at The Alliance for Media Arts + Culture, where she has contributed to mentoring and program development. She has also contributed to the development of The Alliance’s Arts2Work Digital Archivist Apprenticeship Program, a federally recognized apprenticeship pathway in the United States.

== Fellowships ==
- Catherine B. Reynolds Fellowship in Social Entrepreneurship (2008) Catherine B. Reynolds Foundation
- Goldman Sachs Lemelson Senior Fellow, Lemelson Center for the Study of Invention and Innovation, National Museum of American History, Smithsonian Institution (2013)
- A’Lelia Bundles Community Scholar, Columbia University (2014-2017
- Nasir Jones Fellow, Hutchins Center for African and African American Research, Harvard University (2017), Hiphop Archive and Research Institute
- MacArthur Civic Media Fellow, Annenberg Innovation Lab, University of Southern California (2020)
