= American Debate Association =

Intercollegiate debate association

The American Debate Association began in 1985 as an intercollegiate debate association. It uses the resolution selected by the Cross Examination Debate Association and the National Debate Tournament. Currently they have 40 member schools. Its current president is Danielle Verney-O'Gorman, Director of Debate at the United States Naval Academy.

== History ==
The ADA was founded in 1985. The ADA was founded to emphasize the argumentation and persuasive speech elements of policy debate, and to provide a training ground for novice debaters. It was formed in the mid-Atlantic region of the United States, in Virginia, Maryland, DC and Pennsylvania.

== Member schools ==
2017-2018 Member Schools:

Boston College

California State University at Northridge

Concordia College

Emory University

Florida State University

George Mason University

Georgetown University

Harvard University

Indiana University

Liberty University

Michigan State University

Missouri State University

Northwestern University

Samford University

Trinity University

United States Naval Academy

University of California – Berkeley

University of Central Florida

University of Central Oklahoma

University of Florida

University of Georgia

University of Houston

University of Kansas

University of Kentucky

University of Mary Washington

University of Miami

University of Michigan

University of Minnesota

University of Nevada at Las Vegas

University of North Georgia

University of Southern California

University of Texas at Austin

University of Texas at Dallas

University of West Georgia

Vanderbilt University

Wake Forest University

Wayne State University

Wichita State University

== Mission and Policies ==
The ADA's mission of increasing participation, maintaining a balance between education and competition, and ensuring an equitable and fair activity for all programs, regardless of their size or experience is facilitated by the ADA's rules and is premised on the following assumptions:

1. Debate is a controlled discussion which analyzes the substantive issues raised by a particular policy proposition.

2. Debate is a persuasive, oral communication activity in which debaters assume the obligation to communicate reasons for positions taken in a manner that is coherent, intelligible, and consistent with the limitations on human speech and listening.

3. Debate tournaments will be run efficiently, honestly, and in a manner which promotes the educational values of debating for all participants.

4. Coaches and judges are educators whose job it is to effectively prepare students to debate, to objectively and fairy evaluate rounds of competition to which they are assigned, and to behave in an ethical and professional fashion.

5. Debate is an educational activity to be engaged in by undergraduates who are officially enrolled full-time students in good academic standing at the colleges and universities they represent in competition.

== Standing Rules of Tournament Procedure ==
Follow this link for a webpage of the current American Debate Association debate rules: https://americandebateassociation.com/standing-rules/

== See also ==
- Competitive debate in the United States
