= Hip-hop based education =

Hip-hop based education (HHBE) refers to the use of hip-hop, especially rap songs and lyrics, as curricular resources.

Integrating hip-hop into the academic curriculum gives youth more interest in education and promotes literacy. HHBE advocates believe that hip-hop can be used in classrooms to inspire youth to be agents of social and political change. Bringing hip-hop in to educational environments to connect with today's youth is becoming a popular approach that some teachers are deciding to take.

The implementation of hip-hop into curriculum promotes cultural relevance to non-white children, affirmation of urban identities, and deeper learning through connection with something relevant to primitive cultures.

== HHBE programs ==
=== #HipHopEd ===
#HipHopEd is the premiere platform for hip-hop in/as education. It is both an online chat and offline movement dedicated to bringing scholars, teachers, students, and other stakeholders together to engage across a number of topics related to hip-hop and education. Organized by Christopher Emdin and Tim Jones, #HipHopEd has offered discussions, professional development, coaching and training to educators and school leaders across the globe.

=== The Hip-hop Education Guidebook ===
Marcella Runell and Martha Diaz created the "Hip-Hop Education Guidebook: Volume 1", a comprehensive collection of lesson plans and resources that educators can use to integrate hip-hop into their classroom curriculum. The book concept was inspired by Diaz, who founded and curated the Hip-Hop Education Summit with Patricia Wang. The lessons include subjects such as mathematics, science, social justice, literacy, and language arts. The education guide introduces teachers to the many ways that hip-hop education can be used in the classroom and it also validated teachers who had previously implemented hip-hop into their curriculum. Hip-Hop Association published the work and Runell stated that the response has been "tremendous."

=== Hip-hop Educational Literacy Program (H.E.L.P) ===
Asheru, born Gabriel Benn, director of Arts in Education at a D.C. based special education school with the help of Rick Henning launched the H.E.L.P program. It's a monthly periodical and reading supplement designed by teachers and curriculum writers to combine hip-hop music with literacy instruction. Songs for the periodical are chosen based on three criteria, the first being "the song must be socially redeeming or otherwise significant themes addressed in the songs lyrical content, followed by rich vocabulary use, and lastly the song must be performed by a popular artist.

=== Trials of a Hip-hop Educator ===
In 2007 Tony Muhammad started a popular Myspace blog titled "Trials of a Hip-hop Educator". Teachers who were implementing hip-hop into their classrooms could go to this blog and share their struggles with each other.

=== Hip Hop Schoolhouse ===
Hip-hop artist Common, with the help of his mother, Dr. Mahalia Hines, developed a self-help hip-hop series of three books—all written by Common—that were released under the company name Hip Hop Schoolhouse. Dr. Hines, with the help of her education colleagues has also created lesson plans and units on how to teach the series to youth. Each book also includes a hip-hip vocabulary dictionary in the back for teachers who are not familiar with hip-hop language.

=== Hip Hop 101 ===
Hip-hop educator and artist Professor A.L.I. currently teaches a University of California approved Hip-Hop History course entitled "Beats, Rhymes and Life: Hip Hop History 101" as part of the Blend-Ed Consortium of schools (The Athenian School, College Preparatory School, Lick-Wilmerding, Urban School, and Marin Academy) in which his "XFactor' Album is an integrated part of the curriculum, using, as he states, "Hip-Hop to teach Hip-Hop".

=== Hip Hop-Based Design Studies ===
HHDS, as practiced by Georgia Institute of Technology professor Joycelyn Wilson, can be defined as advancing the broader field of Hip Hop studies with design research. It wants to understand how the aesthetic practices, creative sensibilities, techno-pedagogical foundations, and cross-industry adaptations of the art form are used as context cues and style norms when ideating, implementing, and building cross-cultural interactive media platforms.

=== Hip Hop Saves Lives ===
Artist & educator Chad Harper founded Hip Hop Saves Lives as an extra-curricular workshop for youths in schools across New York City. The students write and record a song about a humanitarian "hero" of their choosing; they then film a music video and send it to their hero. One such "hero" was Desmond Tutu.

== International ==
=== Germany ===
Chemnitz Germany hosted the first international "Hip-hop Meets Academia" conference in August 2006.

== Collegiate implementation ==
=== Howard University ===
HBCU, Howard University hosted a panel in 2006 to discuss the option of creating a hip-hop studies minor within the upcoming years. Intellectuals discuss creating a hip-hop minor

=== University of Arizona ===
In 2012, University of Arizona announced the United States' first degree designation around the hip-hop genre. They offer a hip-hop culture minor under the Africana Studies’ department. The program is already underway and will offer an in-depth look at how hip-hop has influenced the American culture in different aspects ranging from hairstyles, graffiti, advertising, and sexuality.

=== Cornell University ===
In 2012, Cornell University announced the appointment of DJ Afrika Bambaataa as a visiting scholar for a three-year term. This is the first ever faculty appointment for a hip-hop pioneer and legend at a major university. He will meet with classes, talk to student and community groups, and perform for several days throughout the year.

Cornell University Library is the home of the largest national archive on hip-hop culture, documenting its birth and growth by preserving thousands of recordings, flyers, photographs, and other artifacts. Cornell University Hip-hop Library

=== University of Wisconsin-Madison ===
UW-Madison offers First Wave Program, which is the first university program in the country centered on urban arts, spoken word and hip-hop culture. The programs offers full-tuition to its members.
