= First Independent Pictures =

American motion picture distributor

- Industry: Motion pictures
- Headquarters: Los Angeles, California, U.S.

First Independent Pictures (FIP) is an American motion picture distribution company.

== History ==
First Independent Pictures was formed in 2004 as a distributor of high quality independent feature and documentary films. In 2013, the company and its library was sold, and is now a division of Modern Media Company.

Titles in the company's library include Gigantic, Edmond, New York Doll, Big Fan, and Holy Rollers.
