= List of policy debaters =

This list of notable policy debaters includes notable people who participated in policy debate in high school or college.

== A ==
- Samuel Alito

== B ==
- David Boies
- Stephen Breyer
- Ben Brown

== C ==
- Erwin Chemerinsky
- Nate Cohn

== D ==
- Pete Davidson

== H ==
- Michael C. Horowitz

== J ==
- Lyndon Johnson
- Samuel L. Jackson

== K ==
- Neal Katyal
- John F. Kennedy

== L ==
- Jennifer Lawrence

== M ==
- Michael Moore

== N ==
- Richard Nixon

== P ==
- Brad Pitt
- Nancy Pelosi

== R ==
- Karl Rove

== S ==
- Bob Shrum
- Ted Sorensen
- Lawrence Summers

== T ==
- Laurence Tribe

== W ==
- Elizabeth Warren
- Oprah Winfrey
