= Resolved (film) =

2007 film by Greg Whiteley

- Theatrical release poster
- Directed by: Greg Whiteley
- Written by: Greg Whiteley
- Produced by: Greg Whiteley
- Starring: Sam Iola; Louis Blackwell; Richard Funches; Matt Andrews
- Cinematography: Tristan Whitman; Liam Dalzell; Brad Barber; Greg Whiteley
- Edited by: Tom Runquist; Greg Whiteley; Brad Barber
- Release date: June 23, 2007 (Los Angeles Film Festival)
- Running time: 91 minutes
- Country: United States
- Language: English

Resolved is a 2007 documentary film concerning the world of high school policy debate. The film was written and directed by Greg Whiteley of New York Doll fame. The film captured the "Audience Award" title at its debut on June 23, 2007 at the Los Angeles Film Festival. The film was produced by One Potato Productions. The film made its television debut on HBO in the summer of 2008 and subsequently received two Emmy nominations: one nomination for Best Documentary; the other for Editing for the 2009 Emmy Awards held in September 2009. In July 2009, it was released on DVD by Image Entertainment.

== Plot ==
Resolved begins by focusing on the careers of Matt Andrews, Sam Iola, one a stand-out rising sophomore, one a rising senior famous within the policy debate community, respectively. The team of Iola and Andrews hails from Highland Park High School, a recognized national debate power from Texas and located in one of the state's wealthiest communities, where students are expected to attend college after graduation. From there, Whiteley shifts his focus to Louis Blackwell and Richard Funches of Jordan High School in Long Beach, California. By contrast to Highland Park, Jordan High's debate team is underfunded, and the school is a public high school with only 12-18% of its students going on to a four-year college. In an underdog style victory, the team of Funches and Blackwell capture the California state championship.

Once the team from Long Beach has won the state championship while playing by the conventional rules of modern policy debate, the team is introduced by their coach Dave Wiltz to Paulo Freire's Pedagogy of the Oppressed. From there, the team from Jordan High changes their debate strategy, arguing against the current strategy used in high school debate, and using Freire's work to show the oppressive nature of the spread and the structure of debate as a whole. Along these lines, Jordan High's team chooses to read slowly and focus on persuasion rather than pure quick argumentation. The team's strategies of using hip-hop music and arguing that policy debate is structured to disadvantage minorities were inspired by The Louisville Project.

At the end of the documentary, however, they are defeated by a "traditional" team. The judge defends his decision by stating that the Jordan High team convinced him that the structure of debate is flawed, but then the debaters went on to use the very structure of debate to continue to defend their arguments. Thus, their arguments were not consistent. They attempt to qualify for the Tournament of Champions, but this loss substantially curtails their dream.

In addition to the social message, Resolved involves commentaries from Supreme Court Justice Samuel Alito, Jane Pauley, and Juan Williams.

== Cast ==
- Louis Blackwell
- Richard Funches
- Jon Bruschke
- Matthew Andrews
- Sam Iola
- Samuel A. Alito
- Jane Pauley
- Josh Lucas
- Juan Williams
- David Wiltz

== See also ==
- Policy debate
- Tournament of Champions (debate)
