= National High School Debate League of China =

Chinese school debate league

The National High School Debate League of China, or simply NHSDLC, is an English-language high school debate league serving mainland China. It uses the public forum debate format. Each year, the NHSDLC sees around 50,000 students participate in its debate workshops and around 12,000 students participate in its regional or national tournaments that it hosts in more than 33 cities in China. According to The Economist, many students believe participating will help their application to a Western university.

It was founded in 2012, and it hosted one of China's first ever English-language high school national debate tournaments for local students at Peking University in May 2013. Each year, its national debate championship hosted in Beijing attracts 450 students from around China. NHSDLC is partnered with Harvard College Mentors for Urban Debate, Penn for Youth Debate, the Princeton Debate Panel, the Chicago Debate Society, the Yale Debate Association, Sunrise International Education, and the Stanford Youth Debate Initiative.
