= Evidence (policy debate) =

Term in policy debate

In a policy debate competition, evidence (sometimes referred to as "cards") consists mainly of two parts. The citation contains all relevant reference information (that is, the author, date of publication, journal, title, etc.). Although every card should contain a complete citation, only the author's name and date of publication are typically cited in a speech. Some teams will also read the author's qualifications if they wish to emphasize this information. The body is a section or portion of the author's original text. The length of a body can vary greatly—cards can be as short as a few sentences and as long as two or more pages. Most cards are between one and five paragraphs in length. The body of a card is often underlined or highlighted in order to eliminate unnecessary or redundant sentences when the card is read in a round. In a round, the tagline (the debater's summary of the evidence) is read first, followed by the body and citation.

As pieces of evidence accumulate use, multiple colors of highlighting and different thicknesses of underlining often accrue, sometimes making it difficult to discern which portion of the evidence was read. If debaters begin and end outside of the underlined or highlighted portion of a card, it is considered good form to "mark" the card to show where one has done the reading during a speech. For that reason, highlighting or underlining once only throughout a year's worth of active debating in tournaments is much preferred practice over re-clipping over the same cards.

To otherwise misrepresent how much of a card was read—either by stopping early or by skipping underlined or highlighted sections—is known as "cross-reading" or "clipping cards", which is generally considered extra-debating the source cited rather than debating one's interlocutor. Although many judges overtly disfavor the practice, it is easy to enforce, especially if judges endeavor to coach less experienced debaters.

As cards are read in a round, it is uncommon for an opponent to collect and examine the cards while a debater is speaking. This uncommon practice originated in part because cards are read at a rate much faster than conversational speed but also because the non-underlined portion of cards is not read in-round. Taking the cards during the speech allows the opponent to question the author's qualifications, the original context of the evidence, etc. before cross-examination. It is generally accepted whichever team is using preparation time has priority to read evidence read previously during a round by both teams. As a result, large amounts of evidence are shared after the use of preparation time but before a speech. Most judges will not deduct from a team's preparation time for time spent finding evidence which the other team has misplaced.

After a round, judges often "call for cards" to examine evidence whose merit was contested during the round or whose weight was emphasized during rebuttals so that they can read the evidence for themselves. Although widespread, this practice is explicitly banned at some tournaments, most notably National Catholic Forensic League nationals, and some judges refuse to call for cards because they believe the practice constitutes "doing work for debaters that should have been done during the round". Judges may also call for evidence for the purpose of obtaining its citation information so that they can produce the evidence for their own school. Opponents and spectators are also generally allowed to collect citations in this manner and some tournaments send scouts to rounds to facilitate the collection of citation references for every team at the tournament, information which is sometimes published online.

Many teams may use other media to present "evidence" such as music, pictures, poetry, dance, etc. Using other media to present evidence is considered a performance argument and the team may defend or claim advantages from the presentation itself and not only the substance.
