= Most Likely to Succeed (film) =

2015 film

- Directed by: Greg Whiteley
- Produced by: Adam Ridley; Greg Whiteley; Adam Leibowitz; Daria Lombroso
- Cinematography: Gabriel Patay
- Edited by: Adam Ridley
- Music by: Josh Ethan Johnson; Matthew Lurie
- Release date: 2015
- Running time: 86 minutes

Most Likely to Succeed is a 2015 feature-length documentary produced by Ted Dintersmith and Tony Wagner and directed by Greg Whiteley.

== Overview ==
The film follows students into the classrooms of High Tech High, a public charter school in San Diego, California. The film combines commentary by a variety of people and follows two groups of ninth graders over the course of a year. The director's experiences with his daughter's school shape the opening to the film and inform his approach to the content and pedagogy of High Tech High. The film takes a closer look at the experiences of several individual students enrolled at the school.

== Release ==
Responses to the film were mixed. A columnist from Education Week, David B. Cohen encourages people to see the film but raised concerns about the single narrative presented in the film. Writing for The Hollywood Reporter, Glenn Heath Jr. remarked the movie is "an engaging look" at 21st-century education but acknowledges the uncertainty the model offers. A classroom teacher who attended a screening of the film described the film as a "paid infomercial" for a particular approach to curriculum design.

Following the film's premiere, Executive Producer Ted Dintersmith took the film on a 50-state tour, screening the film for learning communities across the country. Following his tour, Dintersmith released a new book, What School Could Be: Insights and Inspiration from Teachers Across America. In July 2019, the film was made available on numerous streaming platforms.

== Education history ==
A central theme of the film is based on the need for disruption. This disruption is needed, according to the producers and director of the film, because American education hasn't changed in more than a century. In effect, the film is advocating the misleading "factory model" theory related to the evolution of American public education. This claim has been refuted by multiple education historians.

There are multiple inaccurate statements in the film and the book it is based on. These include:

- The film narration at 0:11:23 says prior to Prussia's actions around public education, formal education primarily consisted of "smart people, sitting around talking to other smart people." The rise of the common school movement, of which Mann was an advocate, is generally recognized as beginning in the 1830s, before Mann went to Prussia. As an example, Pennsylvania's free school law, An Act to Establish a General System of Education by Common Schools, was passed on April 1, 1834.
- At 0:12:23, the voice over says Horace Mann was "stunned. Inspired by what he sees [in Prussia], he brings these educational ideas back to the US where it captures the attention of [Henry Ford, Andrew Carnegie, Cornelius Vanderbilt, and J.P. Morgan.]" At the time of his return from his trip to Prussia in 1843, Ford was not yet born, Carnegie was still living in Scotland and 9 years old, Morgan was 7. While Vanderbilt was 50 years old, he was not explicitly involved in education until the late 1860s when he made a donation to his wife's cousin's husband that would lead to the creation of Vanderbilt University.
- The idea at 0:12:05 of teaching "math in one room, science in another, language skills in yet another" is described as "totally new." This is misleading on two accounts. First, Edward Krug's survey of the history of the American High School identifies 1880 to 1920 as the era that gave rise to the shape and structure seen today, not the 1840s. Second, the idea of different professors or teachers specializing in different content areas was already familiar to American educators before any trips to Prussia. As an example, the Buffalo High School Association was founded in 1827. An ad placed in the Buffalo Emporium and General Advertiser in 1828 extracted the Buffalo High School's by-laws, which included, "The principle is to appoint employ such Professors, or Assistant Teachers, in the several Departments, as maybe determined necessary for the good reputation and rapid advancement of the School… Lectures on Chemistry, Mineralogy, Natural History, Natural Philosophy, Astronomy, and other Sciences; will be delivered at the High-School, which the scholars in the Senior Department may attend free of expense."
