= Policy debate =

Form of competitive debate

Policy debate is an American form of debate competition in which teams of two usually advocate for or against a resolution that advocates a certain policy action by the United States federal government. It is also referred to as cross-examination debate (sometimes shortened to Cross-X or CX) because of the three-minute questions-and-answers period following each constructive speech. Evidence presentation is a crucial part of policy debate. The main argument being debated during a round is to change or not change the status quo. When a team explains why their solvency is greater than the opposition's, they compare advantages. One team’s job is to argue that the resolution—the statement that a specific change to a national or international problem should be made—is a good idea. The affirmative team generally presents a plan as a hypothetical policy proposal which falls under the resolution, while the negative team presents arguments against the implementation of the affirmative team's plan.

A policy debate round will typically take approximately one hour and 30 minutes and comprises a total of eight speeches and four cross-examination periods. Each individual in the debate round gives one “constructive” speech and one “rebuttal” speech. Additionally, each individual will cross-examine their opponent and be cross-examined by their opponent once. The first four speeches in a round are constructive speeches, while the final four speeches are rebuttal speeches. Cross-examination occurs directly following each constructive speech. During constructive speeches, debaters articulate and develop their main points or arguments for or against the hypothetical government action that the affirmative presents in the first speech of the round. During rebuttal speeches, debaters try to rebut (or refute) the arguments made by the other team, while using their own arguments to try to persuade the judge to vote for their team. Usually, the Affirmative has to persuade the judge to vote for their plan in what is called the "burden of proof", while the Negative has to persuade the judge that the affirmative plan is undesirable through the "burden of rejoinder".

High school policy debate is sponsored by various organizations including the National Speech and Debate Association, National Association of Urban Debate Leagues, Catholic Forensic League, Stoa USA, and the National Christian Forensics and Communications Association, as well as many other regional debate and speech organizations. Collegiate policy debates are generally governed by the guidelines of National Debate Tournament (NDT) and the Cross Examination Debate Association (CEDA), which have been joined at the collegiate level. A one-person policy format is sanctioned by the National Forensic Association (NFA)) on the collegiate level as well.

== History ==
Academic debate had its origins in intra-collegiate debating societies, in which students would engage in invitational debates against their classmates. Wake Forest University's debate program claims to have its origins in student literary societies founded on campus in the mid-1830s, which first presented joint "orations" in 1854. Many debating societies that were founded at least as early as the mid-nineteenth century are still active today, though they have generally shifted their focus to intercollegiate competitive debate. In addition to Wake Forest, the debate society at Northwestern University dates to 1855. Boston College's Fulton Debating Society, which was founded in 1868, continues to organize an annual "Fulton Prize Debate" between teams of its own students after the intercollegiate debate season has ended. Other universities continue similar traditions.

Intercollegiate debates have been held since at least as early as the 1890s. History records there were debates between teams from Wake Forest University and Trinity College (later Duke University) beginning in 1897. Additionally, a debate between students from Boston College and Georgetown University occurred on May 1, 1895, in Boston. Whitman College debated Washington State University, Willamette University, and the University of Idaho in the late 1890s. Southwestern claims that the first debate held on its campus was between Southwestern and Fairmount College (which eventually became Wichita State University) but that debate could not have occurred prior to 1895, the year Fairmount College began classes.

By the mid-1970s, regular rules for lengths of speeches developed. Each side (Affirmative and Negative) was afforded two opening "constructive" speeches, and two closing "rebuttal" speeches, for a total of eight speeches each debate round. Each speaker was cross-examined by their opponent for a period following his or her constructive speech. Traditionally rebuttals were half the length of constructives, but when a style of faster delivery speed became more standard in the late 1980s, that time management stricture was dropped. Wake Forest University introduced reformed speech times in both its college (9‑6 instead of 10‑5) and high school (8‑5 instead of 8‑4) tournaments, which spread rapidly to become the new de facto standards.

== Style and delivery ==
=== Speed ===
Policy debaters' speed of delivery will vary from league to league and tournament to tournament. In more progressive and larger tournaments, debaters will speak very quickly - a practice dubbed "spreading" (short for speed reading) - in order to read as much evidence and make as many arguments as possible within the time-constrained speech. Speed reading or spreading is normal at the majority of national circuit policy debate tournaments.

Some, most commonly debaters and coaches not participating on the national debate circuit, feel that the rapid-fire delivery makes debate harder to understand for the layperson. Many further claim that the increased speed encourages debaters to make several poor arguments, as opposed to a few high-quality ones. A slower style is preferred by those who want debates to be understandable to lay people and those who claim that the pedagogical purpose of the activity is to train rhetorical skills. In contrast, rapid delivery is encouraged by those who believe that increased quantity and diversity of arguments makes debates more educational. Proponents of the delivery style, commonly associated or participating in the national circuit, emphasize that spreading can help increase the quality of debates by enabling more nuanced viewpoints, rather than more general positions. Most debaters will vary their rate of delivery depending upon the judge's preferences.

=== Flowing ===
Debaters have a specialized form of note taking, called flowing, to keep track of the arguments presented during a debate. Conventionally, a debater's flow is divided into separate flows for each different macro-argument in the debate round (kritiks, disads, topicalities, case, etc.). There are multiple methods of flowing, but the most common style incorporates columns of arguments made in a given speech. The first constructive speech is flowed from the top of the sheet down in the first column, and the next constructive speech is flowed in the right column next to the first one. Each speech is flowed in separate columns, alternating Affirmative and Negative. Rebuttals are flowed the same.

Certain shorthands for commonly used words are used to keep up with the rapid rate of delivery. The abbreviations or stand-in symbols vary.

== Theory ==
There are many accepted standards in policy debate, and there are several dominant speech argument styles. Sometimes debaters will debate about how policy debate should work. Those arguments are known as "theory" arguments, and they are most often brought up when one team believes the other team is using unfair or noneducational tactics and therefore warrant a loss or other intervention by the judge. They are also brought up to change how an argument is weighted by the judge to either assist themselves or detract from the opponents. Theory debates in-round are not rare, but whole rounds are almost never about theory itself. Theory is argued as part of the decision of the round with the hope of advancing debate the activity and the principles of rhetoric, argumentation, policymaking, and so on that the debaters are engaged in the substantive matter of the topic. Unlike Moot Court, due process is not a theory argument.

=== Burdens of the affirmative ===
When the Affirmative team presents a plan, they take upon the Burden of the Policy to advocate (Justification) a significant change (Significance or Impact) to the status quo and that their plan should be adopted and hence, by default, the resolution that in general will allow for such a plan (Inherency). They must persuade that their plan is an example of the resolution (Topicality, Typicality), and they must prove that the plan is a good idea (Solvency). The Affirmative traditionally must uphold this burden as preferable to the status quo (Harms). Given that the affirmative must prove that they are preferable to the status quo, the negative team always has presumption for winning the round. The negative is automatically the winner unless the affirmative can prove they are better than the status quo.

==== Stock issues ====
One traditional way to judge policy debate is to judge the Affirmative on four issues or burdens to meet, called the stock issues. The four stock issues are modeled after U.S. court procedural aspects of administrative law in deciding cases (as opposed to Constitutional controversies): ill (Harm), blame (Inherency), cure (Solvency), cost (Significance). They are generally known as follows:

- Harm Does the plan acknowledge a problem, a want, a need, of some policy interest implied or alluded to or of interest from the resolution?
- Inherency of the status quo: Is the plan an Intrinsic change? Also, is the plan necessary? What is the Status Quo? Is the affirmative's plan happening already, and if not, why? Inherency promotes strength of originality in advocacy.
- Significance, or Impact upon the status quo: Does the plan warrant change? Does the plan warrant the resolution (Justification)?

What is the problem in the status quo to justify adopting the plan? Is the plan important enough to even warrant consideration or make a difference?

- Solvency advantages: Does the plan deal with the issues presented adequately?

Will the plan solve any problems in the status quo? How much of an impact (positive effect, or Significance) will the plan have?

== Advantages and disadvantages ==
Most affirmative teams today generally frame their case around advantages, which are good effects of their plan. The negative team will often present disadvantages which contend that the affirmative plan causes undesirable consequences.

=== Negation tactic ===
Negation Tactic, also known as Negation Theory, contends that the negative need only negate the affirmative instead of having to negate the resolution. The acceptance of all-inclusive negation, as opposed piecemeal, allows Negative teams to run full argumentation outlines such as topical counterplans with better Solvency that affirms the resolution but still negates the Affirmative's plan.

=== Negative strategy ===
After the affirmative presents its case, the negative can down-vote the case with many different arguments, which include:

- Topicality: The Negative will attempt to argue that the affirmative team does not fall under the rubric of the resolution and should be rejected immediately regardless of the merits or advantages of the plan. This is a type of "meta-debate" argument, as both sides then spend time defining various words or phrases in the resolution, laying down standards for why their definition(s) or interpretation(s) is superior. The Negative side can rebut, "That's obscene! Your dog is still the topic of adoption". Most yearly topics have at least one or two commonly run Affirmative cases that are only arguably topical, so Topicality is often justified as a check or deterrent on and against such plans, which usually have quite strategic components. If run correctly, they are the strongest arguments against case only in unique circumstances. When topicality is run when the affirmative is clearly topical, which is common, it is usually used as a time waster for the affirmative.
- Disadvantages: The negative can claim that there are disadvantages, or adverse effects of the plan, which outweigh any advantages claimed. In order to outweigh any positive effects of the affirmative case, impacts must be arguably "larger" than those of the opposing team. The negative must say what is good now, and how the affirmative's plan causes the impact of their disadvantage. A disadvantage is composed of a uniqueness (a description of the status quo in terms of the impacts of their disadvantage), a link (how the affirmative's plan activates the impact), and an impact (the adverse effect).
- Counterplans: The negative can present a counter solution to the affirmative case's problem which does not have to affirm the resolution (The negative does not have to be topical in making a counterplan). This is generally accompanied by on-case arguments that the affirmative's plan does not solve, as well as disadvantages that link to the affirmative case but not the counterplan. Counterplans narrow down the on-case arguments to: advantages the counterplan can not borrow, the inherency, and the solvency. Upon the negative running a counterplan, most debates boil down to the solvency of the affirmative case, and the disadvantages. Counterplans must be competitive with the plan. That means that the counterplan must either be mutually exclusive with the affirmative (for example, one cannot both increase oil production (a hypothetical plan) and decrease oil production (a hypothetical counterplan) or be undesirable in conjunction with the plan (the negative must win that the inclusion of the plan would cause some form of harm that the counterplan alone would avoid). There is ongoing disagreement between models of textual competition, functional competition, or any combination between the two.
- Kritiks: The negative can claim that the affirmative holds a certain mindset or assumption that should be grounds for rejection or a different mutually exclusive alternative to the Affirmative's plan. Kritiks are sometimes a reason to reject the entire affirmative advocacy without evaluating its policy; other times, kritiks can be evaluated within the same strictures as the affirmative case as to who is hypocritical or irrelevant or prejudiced, etc. Examples of some areas of literature for kritiks include biopower, racism, centralized government, and anthropocentrism. Kritiks arose in the early 1990s, with the first kritiks based in deconstructionist philology about the ambiguity of the language used (diction) and were championed by debaters Shane Stafford and Bill Shanahan. A kritik is built with a link (how the affirmative activates the impacts), an impact (the impact of a kritik is slightly different to regular impacts. They are more similar to harms and the impacts are saying that the affirmative team prolongs these harms), and the alternative (a way to fix the impacts, often in a very extreme manner. An example would be destroying the entire American government to fix institutionalized racism).
- Theory: Sometimes the subject matter of the affirmative's case will create uneven Grounds at the beginning. In these cases, the negative can object to the procedure or content of the affirmative case. These objections are part of a Grounds theory debate in that they try to delineate what has been disavailed from fouling Grounds in a debate round.

== Evidence ==
Evidence in debates is organized into units called cards (because such evidence was originally printed on note cards, though the practice has long been replaced by digital storage). Cards are designed to condense an author's argument so that debaters have an easy way to access the information. A card is composed of three parts: the argument or evidence summary, the evidence that supports the argument, and the citation. The argument part, sometimes called the tag(line), is the debater's summary of the argument presented in the body. A tag is usually only one or two sentences. The citation contains all relevant reference citation information (that is, the author, date of publication, journal, title, etc.). Although every card should contain a complete citation, only the author's name and date of publication are typically spoken aloud in a speech. Some teams will also read the author's qualifications if they wish to emphasize this information. Qualifications are only included in trying to increase the weight of your cards against your opponents'. The body is a fragment of the author's original text. The length of a body can vary greatly—cards can be as short as a few sentences and as long as two or more pages. Most cards are between one and five paragraphs in length. The body of a card is often underlined or highlighted in order to eliminate unnecessary or redundant sentences when the card is read in a round. In a round, the tag is read first, followed by the citation and the body.

Often, especially on the national circuit, a debater will share any cards they plan to read with their opponents and the judge immediately before their speech. If cards are not shared before the speech, it is common for an opponent to collect and examine evidence even while a speech is still going on. This practice originated in part because cards are read at a rate faster than conversational speed. Taking the cards during the speech allows the opponent to question the author's qualifications, the original context of the evidence, etc. in cross-examination. It is generally accepted whichever team is using preparation time has priority to read evidence read previously during a round by both teams. As a result, large amounts of evidence may change hands after the use of preparation time but before a speech. Most judges will not deduct from a team's preparation time for time spent finding evidence which the other team has misplaced.

After a round, judges sometimes "call for cards" to examine evidence whose merit was contested during the round or whose weight was emphasized during rebuttals so that they can read the evidence for themselves. Although widespread, this practice is explicitly banned at some tournaments, most notably National Catholic Forensic League nationals, and some judges refuse to call for cards because they believe the practice constitutes "doing work for debaters that should have been done during round". Judges may also call for evidence for the purpose of obtaining its citation information so that they can produce the evidence for their own school. Opponents and spectators are also generally allowed to collect citations in this manner, and some tournaments send scouts to rounds to facilitate the collection of cites for every team at the tournament, information which is sometimes published later.

== Judging ==
A judge is an individual responsible for deciding the winner and loser of a policy round as well as assessing the merits of the speakers. Judges merit a good debate round and, ideally, avoid inserting their own personal beliefs that might cloud impartiality, however, total impartiality is impossible which has led to judges adopting a paradigm. Judges are sometimes coaches who help debate teams improve.

Some circuits see lay or inexperienced judges recruited from the community as an important part of the activity of a debate club. Debaters in these circuits should be able to adapt their presentations to individuals with no debate experience at all, as well as maintaining high standards of debate for judges who have themselves been debaters. A common saying is that debate is a game of judges/judge adaptation. This use of lay judges significantly alters delivery and argumentation, as the rapid-fire style and complex debate-theory arguments are frequently new to lay judges. For this reason, other circuits restrict policy debate judging to qualified judges, generally ex-debaters.

=== Speaker points ===
The judge is assigned for deciding a winner, but also must allot points to each debater. "Speaker points" are numeric merit scores that the judge awards the debaters on their speaking skills. Speaker point schemes vary throughout local state and regional organizations particularly at the high school level. However, the method accepted by most national organizations such as the National Forensic League, Tournament of Champions, National Catholic Forensic League, Cross-Examination Debate Association, and National Debate Tournament, use values ranging from 1 to 30. In practice, within these organizations the standard variation is 26‑29, where 26's are given to extremely poor speakers, where a perfect score is considered incredibly rare and warranted only by an outstanding performance. Most tournaments accept half-point gradations, for example 28.5s, or even by tenths. Generally, speaker points are seen as secondary in importance to wins and losses, yet often correlate with a team's win/loss rate. In other words, the judge usually awards the winning team cumulatively higher speaker points than the losing team. If the judge does not, the decision is considered a "low-point win". Low-point wins simply mean that the team with better argumentation did not speak as well as their competitors, which is rare, because judges will vote for teams that speak better overall and award higher speaker points to teams who deliver a better debate. The difference can be stated as so, "the low-point winning team are better debaters, and the high-point losing team provided a better debate round".

In some smaller jurisdictions, the judge ranks the speakers 1‑4 instead of awarding them speaker points. Either speaker-point calculation may be used to break ties among teams with like records. Some areas also use speaker rankings in addition to speaker points in order to differentiate between speakers awarded the same number of points.

At a majority of tournaments, debaters also receive "speaker awards", which are awarded to the debaters who received the greatest number of speaker points. Many tournaments also drop the highest and lowest score received by each debater, in order to ensure that the speaker award calculations are fair and consistent, despite the preferences of different judges. The number of speaker awards given out varies based on the number of debaters competing at any given tournament. For instance, a small local tournament might only award trophies or plaques to the top three debaters, whereas a widely attended "national circuit" tournament might give out awards to the top ten or fifteen speakers.

=== Paradigms ===
Most debate judges (who were usually debaters in high school and/or college) generally carry a mindset that favors certain arguments and styles over others. Depending on what mindset, or paradigm, the judge uses, the debate can be drastically different. Because there is no one view of debate agreed upon by everyone, many debaters question a judge about their paradigm and/or their "feelings" on specific arguments before the round. After the round, the judge can clarify.

Not every judge fits perfectly into one paradigm or another. A judge may say that they are "tabula rasa", or willing to listen to anything, but draw the line at arguments they consider to be offensive (such as arguments in favor of racism). Or, a judge might be a "policymaker", but still look at the debate in an offense/defense framework like a games-playing judge. Many judges also view the round through either "tech over truth," which prefers in-round argumentation and evidence or "truth over tech," which prefers using common sense and commonly accepted knowledge.

Examples of paradigms include:

- Stock issues: In order for the affirmative team to win, their plan must retain all of the stock issues, which are Harms, Inherency, Solvency, Topicality, and Significance. For the negative to win, they only need to prove that the affirmative fails to meet one of the stock issues. These judges are more likely to dislike newer arguments such as criticism alternatives and some theoretical points.
- Policymaker: At the end of the round, the judge compares the affirmative plan with either the negative counter-plan or the status quo. Whichever one is a better policy option is the winner. The better policy option is determined by comparing the advantages and disadvantages of each.
- Tabula rasa: From the Latin for "blank slate", the judge attempts to come into the round with no predispositions. These judges typically expect debaters to "debate it out", which includes telling the judge what paradigm, or decisionrule, they should use to judge the round.
- Games player: Views debate as a game. Judges who use this paradigm tend to be concerned with whether or not each team has a fair chance at winning the debate. They usually view the debate flow as a game board and look at arguments according to an offense/defense structure.
- Speaking skills/communications: This kind of judge is concerned with good presentation and persuasion skills. They tend to vote for teams who are more articulate and those who present arguments in the most appealing way. These judges usually disapprove of speed.
- Hypothesis tester: In order for the affirmative to win, they convince the judge to support the resolution. Conversely, the negative must convince the judge to negate the resolution. The paradigm has two main opposing flavors. In the above, the experimental, the resolution is fitted to a hypothetical or semblematic or model case, and the status quo is deviated by scenario-setting for the convenience of the debate tournament where "risk assessment" is a debate on standards, norms, procedures, expectations, and relevance: what an agent already knows how to do presumes no loss, that they can do. The traditional flavor is more agnostic and real-world but is debated by using simple litmus tests on "credibility and truthtelling" whose credo has the feature of "risk adverse".
- Kritikal: Judges who prefer kritik debates may look to who most effectively solves patriarchy, racism, orientalism, ocularcentrism (myopia), or other perceived oppressiveness.
- Stasis oratory: The judge gives the closure of the round. Judges who know stasis theory do not overexplain what it is and tend to be pedagogical, coaching debaters after the round to help improve debaters' appreciation of debate and oratory, by speaking on arguments and argumentation, strategy and tactics, presentation and flow, rather than speaking on their personal judgment and analysis or judge's paradigm. But these judges do judge and are not paradigm-based in their ballot voting.

== Competition ==
=== Tournaments ===
Most high school debaters debate in local tournaments in their city, state or nearby states. Thousands of tournaments are held each year at high schools and certain colleges throughout the US.

A small subset of high school debaters, mostly from elite public and private schools, travel around the country to tournaments in what is called the 'national circuit.' The championship of the national circuit is usually considered to be the Tournament of Champions, also called the TOC, at the University of Kentucky, which requires formal qualification in the form of two or more bids to the tournament. Bids are achieved by reaching a certain level of elimination rounds (for example, quarter-finals) at select, highly competitive, and carefully chosen tournaments across the country based upon the quality of debaters they attract and the diversity of locations from across the United States they represent. Debater partnerships with 2 bids are guaranteed a spot at the TOC, whereas debater teams with 1 bid (At-large teams) may be admitted if they consistently advance far in the elimination rounds or come close to winning a bid several other times.

=== Urban debate ===
Urban debate leagues give students in urban school districts an opportunity to participate in policy debate. There are currently urban debate leagues in 24 of the largest cities in the United States. In total, more than 500 high schools participate in the league and more than 40,000 students have competed in urban debate.

=== Rural debate ===
The Rural Debate Initiative ("RuDI") expands access to debate to secondary school students residing in rural America. RuDI partners with top college programs to provide weekly coaching sessions, internal debate tournaments and summer debate camps to rural students in a virtual format at no cost. RuDI is organized by a five-member board, including Executive Grant Zhang, President Kelly Mu, Assistant Jared Shirts, Outreach Ambassador Ann Schulte, and Coach Joseph Smith. The RuDI also provides supplemental programs such as leadership development initiatives and career development workshops to champion and leverage the assets unique to rural communities and rural individuals, such as their pride of place, close-knittedness, and diverse set of practical skills.

=== Championships ===
==== High school ====
There is some dispute over what constitutes the "national championship" in the United States per se, but three tournaments generally compete for the title: The Tournament of Champions held at the University of Kentucky, the National Debate Coaches' Association Championship (NDCA), and the National Speech and Debate tournament sponsored by the National Speech and Debate Association (formerly known as the National Forensics League). For the highest level of competition, the Tournament of Champions is generally considered to be the more prestigious title to hold.

- Other national championships include:
  - The Grand National Tournament of the National Catholic Forensic League.
  - The National Championship of the National Association of Urban Debate Leagues (NAUDL).
  - The National Christian Forensics and Communications Association (NCFCA)
  - The National Invitational Tournament of Champions (NITOC) of Stoa USA

==== Texas Forensic Association Debate ====
In Texas, most debate occurs in Texas Forensic Association (TFA) tournaments. The other major debate organization is the University Interscholastic League (UIL).

==== College ====
There is no single unified national championship in college debate; though the National Debate Tournament (NDT), the Cross Examination Debate Association (CEDA) and the American Debate Association (ADA) all host national tournaments. The NDT committee issues a ranking report of the top 16 teams in the country ("first round bids") for automatic advancement to the NDT in early February. The report roughly determines a regular season champion called the 'Copeland Award' for the team rated the highest over the course of the year through early February.

=== Institutes and camps ===
While once attended by only highly competitive policy debaters, many high school students now attend debate institutes, which are typically held at colleges in the summer. Most institutes range from about two to seven weeks, with four weeks being the most common.

Many institutes divide students into work groups, or "labs", based on skill level and experience. Many even offer specialized "advanced" or "scholars" workshops, to which acceptance is highly limited.

These camps often set the tone for the upcoming season and produce much of the evidence used by debaters at the beginning of the year.

== Resolutions ==
A resolution or topic is a statement which the affirmative team affirms and the negative team negates. Resolutions are selected annually by affiliated schools. Most resolutions from the 1920s to 2005 have begun "Resolved: that The United States federal government should" although some variations from that template have been used both before the NDT-CEDA merger and with the 2006–2007 college policy debate topic, which limited the affirmative agent to the United States Supreme Court.

At the college level, a number of topics are proposed and interested parties write "topic papers" discussing the pros and cons of that individual topic. Each school then gets one vote on the topic. The single topic area voted on then has a number of proposed topic wordings, one is chosen, and it is debated by affiliated students nationally for the entire season (standard academic school year).

At the high-school level, "topic papers" are also prepared but the voting procedure is different. Those papers are then presented to a topic selection committee which rewords each topic and eventually narrows down the number of topics to five topics. Then the five resolutions are put to a two-tiered voting system. State forensic associations, the National Forensic League, and the National Catholic Forensic League all vote on the five topics, narrowing it down to two. Then the two topics are again put to a vote, and one topic is selected.

- The 2010-2011 high school resolution was:

Resolved: The United States federal government should substantially reduce its military and/or police presence in one or more of the following: South Korea, Japan, Afghanistan, Kuwait, Iraq, Turkey.

- The 2011–2012 high school resolution was:

Resolved: The United States federal government should substantially increase its exploration and/or development of space beyond the Mesosphere.

- The 2012–2013 high school resolution was:

Resolved: The United States federal government should substantially increase its transportation infrastructure investment in the United States.

- The 2013–2014 high school resolution was:

Resolved: The United States federal government should substantially increase its economic engagement toward Cuba, Mexico or Venezuela.

- The 2014–2015 high school resolution was:

Resolved: The United States federal government should substantially increase its non-military exploration and/or development of the Earth's oceans.

- The 2015–2016 high school resolution was:

Resolved: The United States federal government should substantially curtail its domestic surveillance.

- The 2016–2017 high school resolution was:

Resolved: The United States federal government should substantially increase its economic and/or diplomatic engagement with the People's Republic of China.

- The 2017–2018 high school resolution was:

Resolved: The United States federal government should substantially increase its funding and/or regulation of primary and/or secondary education in the United States.

- The 2018-2019 high school resolution was:

Resolved: The United States federal government should substantially reduce its restrictions on legal immigration to the United States.

- The 2019-2020 high school resolution was:

Resolved: The United States federal government should substantially reduce Direct Commercial Sales and/or Foreign Military Sales of arms from the United States.

- The 2020-2021 high school resolution was:

Resolved: The United States federal government should enact substantial criminal justice reform in the United States in one or more of the following: forensic science, policing, sentencing.

- The 2021-2022 high school resolution was:

Resolved: The United States federal government should substantially increase its protection of water resources in the United States.

- The 2022-2023 high school resolution was:

Resolved: The United States federal government should substantially increase its security cooperation with the North Atlantic Treaty Organization in one or more of the following areas: artificial intelligence, biotechnology, cybersecurity.

- The 2023–2024 high school resolution was:

Resolved: The United States federal government should substantially increase fiscal redistribution in the United States by adopting a federal jobs guarantee, expanding Social Security, and/or providing a basic income.

- The 2024-2025 high school resolution was:

Resolved: The United States federal government should significantly strengthen its protection of domestic intellectual property rights in copyrights, patents, and/or trademarks.

- The 2025-2026 high school resolution is:

Resolved: The United States federal government should significantly increase its exploration and/or development of the Arctic.

- The 2026-2027 high school resolution is:

Resolved: The United States federal government should establish national health insurance in the United States.

== Event structure ==
The times and speech order are generally as follows:

Speech	Time (High School)	Time (College)
First Affirmative Constructive (1AC)	8 minutes	9 minutes
Cross-examination of First Affirmative by Second Negative	3 minutes	3 minutes
First Negative Constructive (1NC)	8 minutes	9 minutes
Cross-examination of First Negative by First Affirmative	3 minutes	3 minutes
Second Affirmative Constructive (2AC)	8 minutes	9 minutes
Cross-examination of Second Affirmative by First Negative	3 minutes	3 minutes
Second Negative Constructive (2NC)	8 minutes	9 minutes
Cross-examination of Second Negative by Second Affirmative	3 minutes	3 minutes
First Negative Rebuttal (1NR)	5 minutes	6 minutes
First Affirmative Rebuttal (1AR)	5 minutes	6 minutes
Second Negative Rebuttal (2NR)	5 minutes	6 minutes
Second Affirmative Rebuttal (2AR)	5 minutes	6 minutes

In addition to speeches, policy debates may allow for a certain amount of preparation time, or "prep time," during a debate round.

== See also ==
- Glossary of policy debate terms
- Plan inclusive counterplan
- Resolved (film)
- List of policy debaters

== Bibliography ==
- Cheshier, David. (2002). Drills to Improve your Debate Speaking. Rostrum. Retrieved December 30, 2005.
- Gary Alan Fine (2001). Gifted Tongues: High School Debate and Adolescent Culture. Princeton University Press. ISBN 0-691-07450-X. OCLC 45066311.
- Joe Miller (2006). Cross-X. Farrar, Straus and Giroux. ISBN 978-0-374-13194-4.
- Dana Hensley & Diana Carlin (2005). Mastering Competitive Debate 7th Ed. Perfection Learning. ISBN 0-931054-70-2. OCLC 47206277.
- Leslie Phillips; William S. Hicks; Douglas R. Springer & Maridell Fryar (2001). Basic Debate 4th Ed. Glenco/McGraw-Hill. ISBN 0-8442-5981-0. OCLC 34622992.
- Glass, David. Former President of NDCA. "The Policy Debate Topic Selection Meeting." National Forensic League. 22 June 2006
- Glass, David. Former President of NDCA. "Post-Modern Critiques as Stratagems in the Policy Debate Discourse." National Forensic League. 2005
- Hahn, Allison; Taylor Ward Hahn; and Marie-Odile N. Hobeika. (2013). Finding Your Voice: A Comprehensive Guide to Collegiate Policy Debate. International Debate Education Association Press.
- Hanes, T. Russell. (2008). The "How to" of Debate. Lulu Press. ISBN 978-1-329-10932-2.
- NFL's Rostrum, policy debate archives
- U. Vermont's list of debate theory articles
