= Structure of policy debate =

In all forms of policy debate, the order of speeches is as follows:

1. AFF constructive 1 (1AC)

a. Cross-examination (by NEG speaker 2)

2. NEG constructive 1 (1NC)

a. Cross-examination (by AFF speaker 1)

4. AFF constructive 2 (2AC)

a. Cross-examination (by NEG speaker 1)

5. NEG constructive 2 (2NC)

a. Cross-examination (By AFF speaker 2)

6. First Negative Rebuttal (1NR)

7. First Affirmative Rebuttal (1AR)

8. Second Negative Rebuttal (2NR)

9. Second Affirmative Rebuttal (2AR)

In high school, all four constructive speeches are generally eight minutes long and all four rebuttal speeches are four or five minutes in length depending on the region; in college they are nine and six minutes long respectively. All cross-examination periods are three minutes long in high school and in college.

== History ==
Traditionally, rebuttals were half the length of constructive speeches, 8–4 min in high school and 10–5 min in college. The now-prevailing speech time of 8–5 min in high school and 9-5 in college was introduced in the 1990s. Some states, such as Missouri, Massachusetts and Colorado, still use the 8–4 min format at the high school level.

== 1AC ==
The First Affirmative Constructive (1AC) is the first speech given in a round, presented by the affirmative team. Nearly every 1AC includes inherency, advantages, and solvency, as well as a plan text, the textual expression of the affirmative policy option. The 1AC is generally pre-scripted before the round.

== 1NC ==
The First Negative Constructive (1NC) is the first speech given by the negative team and the second speech in the round. It is given by the first negative speaker.

The 1NC will generally present all of the major arguments which the negative plans to present in the round. Off-case arguments made include topicality, disadvantages, counter plans, and critiques. The negative generally also goes on case, contesting the advantage scenarios presented by the affirmative in the 1AC, also often contesting solvency and/or inherency.

== 2AC ==
The Second Affirmative Constructive (2AC) is the second speech given by the affirmative team, the third speech in the round, given by the second affirmative speaker.

The 2AC must answer all of the arguments read in the 1NC. If there is time remaining, the 2AC sometimes also includes add-ons, or additional advantage scenarios. If negative arguments are not addressed, they are considered conceded.

== 2NC ==
The Second Negative Constructive (2NC) is the second speech given by the negative team, the fourth speech in the round, given by the second negative speaker.

It is the first part of the negative block and thus will only cover part of the 2AC.

Often the 2NC will bring up new arguments, to require the 1AR to cover more arguments in their 5 minutes (6 minutes in college). However, some judges consider it abusive to add new off-case arguments, as the affirmative only has five minutes to respond. It is not inappropriate to ask the judge's view on allowing new arguments in the 2NC; after all it is a constructive speech.

== 1NR ==
The First Negative Rebuttal (1NR) is the third speech given by the negative team, the fifth speech in the round, given by the first negative speaker.

Because it is the second part of the negative block, it usually takes arguments not covered by the 2NC. The 1NR can also take arguments which the 2NC did not finish answering or which the 2NC realizes that it accidentally dropped during the cross-examination.

The 1NR undoubtedly has the most preparation time of any speech given in the debate. It can often start prepping during the 2AC, and always has whatever prep time is taken for the 2NC, the 2NC, and the cross-examination of the 2NC to prepare (after cross-examining the 2AC). This amounts to a minimum of 11 minutes in high school and 12 minutes in college even if no preparation time is taken for the 2NC (rare). Theoretically, the 1NR could spend a few minutes preparing and then give the speech (subvocally) twice before having to speak.

As a result, the 1NR will often answer the 2AC arguments which are more preparation intensive (arguments to which the negative does not already have prescripted blocks). Although the 1N is the first speaker to be done with speeches in the round, a good 1N will continue to flow the rest of the speeches to protect the 2NR and retain a more accurate flow to have more information for future rounds.

== 1AR ==
The First Affirmative Rebuttal (1AR) is the first rebuttal speech given by the affirmative, the sixth speech in the round.

The 1AR must respond to the entirety of the negative block. The ratio of negative block time to 1AR time is 5:00 in high school and 5:2 in college. A 1AR may make strategic concessions or undercover certain positions to gain a time trade off to compensate for this apparent inequity. The 1AR is also in many ways a shadow speech for the 2AR and the community consensus between what constitutes shadow coverage and what leaves legitimate room for 2AR extrapolation is still contested.

Almost all judges will allow the 1AR to read new pieces of evidence and make new arguments, especially in response to new arguments during the negative block. However, it is generally frowned upon to bring up new arguments in the rebuttals, because the opposing team may not have enough time to respond to all arguments.

== 2NR ==
The Second Negative Rebuttal (2NR) is the fourth and last speech given by the negative team. It is the seventh speech in the debate, given by the second negative speaker.

The 2NR will often take the remainder of the negative's preparation time.

The 2NR will usually only go for some of the arguments presented in the 1NC although community norms prevent it for going for 1NC arguments which were not extended in the negative block. Especially in rounds with experienced debaters, the 2NR will usually try to win the round with as few arguments as possible enabling it to effectively cover all relevant 1AR arguments while gaining a substantial time trade off. However, sometimes the 2NR will go for multiple positions, allowing it to win the round in multiple worlds, if it believes it can effectively pressure the 2AR. This is risky because the 2AR, in that situation, will most likely go for the arguments which the 2NR covered the least.

The 2NR also has to "close doors" for the 2AR by predicting the areas in which the 2AR will attempt new extrapolation. The 2NR can caution the judge to reject new 2AR arguments but this is less effective than preempting such arguments with "even if" statements.

== 2AR ==
The Second Affirmative Rebuttal (2AR) is the second rebuttal speech given by the affirmative, and the eighth and final speech in the round.

The 2AR generally only answers the arguments made by the 2NR, going to other flows only when the affirmative believes the negative has made a strategic blunder on that piece of paper. In general, the 2AR may not make new arguments that were not in the 1AR. However, because the negative does not go for arguments that the 1AR had to answer, the 2AR is almost always bigger than the portion of the 1AR it represents. Some arguments are never new, like certain forms of extrapolation from 1AR arguments and impact calculus (although many judges prefer it earlier in the round).

The 2AR will almost never present new pieces of evidence but often will refer to pieces of evidence read earlier in the round by their citation, especially if the affirmative wants the judge to read that piece of evidence after the round.

== Cross-examination periods ==
Following each constructive speech, there is a three-minute cross-examination period in which the opposing team questions the team which just spoke. Usually, the cross-examination is conducted by the opponent who will not speak next of the speaker who just spoke, but some cross-examinations are open, that is: either partner may ask or answer questions. However, it is often frowned upon when a partner who is not the previous speaker answers cross-examination questions. Typically the cross examiner and the cross examined will not be allowed to look at each other during cross examination.

== Preparation time ==
In addition to speeches, policy debates may allow for a certain amount of preparation time, or "prep time", during a debate round. NSDA rules call for eight minutes of total prep time that can be used, although in practice high school debate tournaments often give eight minutes of prep time. College debates typically have 10 minutes of preparation time. The preparation time is used at each team's preference; they can use different amounts of preparation time before any of their speeches, or even none at all.

== Alternative use time ==
Some tournaments have neither cross-examination time nor preparation time. Rather, each team is given 16 minutes of alternative use time. Alternative use time can always be used as prep time but after a constructive speech it also doubles as cross-examination time. Thus, if the 2AC needs six minutes to get ready after the 1NC, the first affirmative speaker would get to cross-examine the first negative speaker for those six minutes while the second affirmative speaker is preparing. Alternative use time may not be used for cross-examination after rebuttal speeches.
