= National Debate Tournament =

American national championship of intercollegiate policy debate

The National Debate Tournament is one of the national championships for collegiate policy debate in the United States. The tournament is sponsored by the American Forensic Association with the Ford Motor Company Fund.

== History of the NDT ==
The National Debate Tournament (NDT) began in 1947 at the United States Military Academy at West Point. Twenty-nine schools competed at the first NDT debating: "Resolved: That labor should be given a direct share in the management of industry". It remained at West Point through 1966, at which time the Tournament Director met with the district chairs and advised them that at the tournament banquet of the Military Academy's decision to discontinue hosting the NDT in the ensuing years in part because of the increased demands on space and money that the United States' growing involvement in the Vietnam War was placing on the Academy.

Since then the tournament has moved to different member schools each year and only three schools have hosted it twice.

Selection of the 78 teams participating at the NDT involves a three stage process.

== Past Resolutions ==
The National Debate Tournament currently debates the topic selected by the Cross Examination Debate Association, but used to debate its own, separate, topic. Wake Forest University maintains a list of earlier resolutions used at the National Debate Tournament.
