= Cross Examination Debate Association =

US student debating association

Cross Examination Debate Association(CEDA)
- Type: Nonprofit organization, policy debate
- Founded: 1971
- Headquarters: United States
- Key people: Phillip Samuels, President
- Website: cedadebate.org

The Cross Examination Debate Association (CEDA) (/ˈsiːdə/ SEE-də) is the largest intercollegiate policy debate association in the United States. Throughout the school year, CEDA sanctions over 60 tournaments throughout the nation, including an annual National Championship Tournament that brings together over 175 individual debate teams from across the nation to compete on the basis of research, persuasive speaking, argumentation, and philosophy.

For a number of years, CEDA employed a two-person team value debate format. CEDA utilized two topics each year, one governing the fall semester and the second governing the spring semester. For the spring 1996 topic, it was voted to continue debating the fall topic about Mexico. Beginning with the 1996–1997 season, however, CEDA has employed a single, year-long policy debate topic.

== History of Winners and Topics ==
Previous Winners

- 1986 – Macalester College (Paul Benson and Molly McGinnis)
- 1987 – Macalester College (Paul Benson and Molly McGinnis)
- 1988 – Southern Illinois University (Mark West and John Lapham)
- 1989 – Gonzaga University (Dave Hanson and Bill DeForeest)
- 1990 – University of Central Oklahoma (then Central State University) (Charles Mallard and Josh Hoe)
- 1991 – Kansas State University (David Filippi and Richard McCollum)
- 1992 – Missouri State University (Jeffrey Jarman and TJ Wolfe)
- 1993 – Kansas State University (Jill Basinger and KJ Wall)
- 1994 – University of Missouri–Kansas City (David Kingston (Genco) and James Brian Johnston)
- 1995 – Michigan State University (Elizabeth Repko and Jason Trice)
- 1996 – Southern Illinois University (Glen Frappier and Bill Shinn)
- 1997 – Northwestern University (Terry Johnson and Brandon Fletcher)
- 1998 – Emory University (Stephen Heidt and Dan Fitzmier)
- 1999 – Whitman College (Jessica Clarke and Adam Symonds)
- 2000 – State University of West Georgia (Rachel Saloom and Sarah Holbrook)
- 2001 – State University of West Georgia (Rashad Evans and Sarah Holbrook)
- 2002 – Fort Hays State University (Joe Ramsey and Jason Regnier)
- 2003 – New York University (Richard Garner and Nate Gorelick)
- 2004 – Emory University (Mike Beckley and Henry Liu)
- 2005 – University of California, Berkeley (Craig Wickersham and Stacey Nathan)
- 2006 – Harvard University (Michael Klinger and Nikhil Mirchandani)
- 2007 – University of Oklahoma (Conor Cleary and Blake Johnson)
- 2008 – Towson University (Dayvon Love and Deven Cooper)
- 2009 – University of Oklahoma (R.J. Giglio and Nick Watts)
- 2010 – University of Oklahoma (R.J. Giglio and Nick Watts)
- 2011 – Kansas State University (Beth Mendenhall and Derek Ziegler)
- 2012 – University of Oklahoma (R.J. Giglio and Christopher Leonardi)
- 2013 – Emporia State University (Ryan Wash and Eli Smith)
- 2014 – Towson University (Korey Johnson and Ameena Ruffin)
- 2015 – Towson University (Troi Thomas and Kevin Whitley)
- 2016 – University of Vermont (Khalil Lee and Taylor Brough)
- 2017 – Rutgers University (Nick Nave and Devane Murphy)
- 2018 – University of Iowa (Sam Gustavson and Geordano Liriano)
- 2019 – University of Oklahoma (Jazmine Pickens and Darius White)
- 2020 – Tournament canceled due to COVID-19
- 2021 – University of Texas (Het Desai and Zachary Watts)
- 2022 – Wake Forest University (Asya Taylor and Dimarvin Puerto)
- 2023 – Wake Forest University (Ana Bittner and Ari Davidson)
- 2024 – Binghamton University (Eli T. Louis and Akif Choudhury)
- 2025 – University of Iowa (Grey Parfenoff and Spencer Anderson McElligott)
- 2026 – University of Kansas (Kate'Lynn Shaw and Nargis Suleman)

Topics

  - 2010–2011 – "Resolved: The United States Federal Government should substantially increase the number of and/or substantially expand beneficiary eligibility for its visas for one or more of the following: employment-based immigrant visas, nonimmigrant temporary worker visas, family-based visas, human trafficking-based visas."
  - 2011–2012 – "Resolved: The United States Federal Government should substantially increase its democracy assistance for one or more of the following: Bahrain, Egypt, Libya, Syria, Tunisia, Yemen."
  - 2012–2013 – "Resolved: The United States Federal Government should substantially reduce restrictions on and/or substantially increase financial incentives for energy production in the United States of one or more of the following: coal, crude oil, natural gas, nuclear power, solar power, wind power."
  - 2013–2014 – "Resolved: The United States Federal Government should substantially increase statutory and/or judicial restrictions on the war powers authority of the President of the United States in one or more of the following areas: targeted killing; indefinite detention; offensive cyber operations; or introducing United States Armed Forces into hostilities."
  - 2014–2015 – "Resolved: The United States should legalize all or nearly all of one or more of the following in the United States: marijuana, prostitution, online gambling, the sale of human organs, physician assisted suicide."
  - 2015–2016 – "Resolved: The United States should significantly reduce its military presence in one or more of the following: the Arab states of the Persian Gulf, the Greater Horn of Africa, Northeast Asia."
  - 2016–2017 – "Resolved: The United States Federal Government should establish a domestic climate policy, including at least substantially increasing restrictions on private sector emissions of greenhouse gases in the United States."
  - 2017–2018 – "Resolved: The United States Federal Government should establish national health insurance in the United States."
  - 2018– 2019 – "Resolved: The United States Federal Government should substantially increase statutory and/or judicial restrictions on the executive power of the President of the United States in one or more of the following areas: authority to conduct first-use nuclear strikes; congressionally delegated trade power; exit from congressional-executive agreements and Article II treaties; judicial deference to all or nearly all federal administrative agency interpretations of statutes and/or regulations; the bulk incidental collection of all or nearly all foreign intelligence information on United States persons without a warrant."
  - 2019–2020 – "Resolved: The United States Federal Government should establish a national space policy substantially increasing its international space cooperation with the People’s Republic of China and/or the Russian Federation in one or more of the following areas:
    - arms control of space weapons;
    - exchange and management of space situational awareness information;
    - joint human spaceflight for deep space exploration;
    - planetary defense;
    - space traffic management;
    - space-based solar power."
- 2020–2021 – "Resolved: The United States Federal Government should reduce its alliance commitments with Japan, the Republic of Korea, North Atlantic Treaty Organization member states, and/or the Republic of the Philippines, by at least substantially limiting the conditions under which its defense pact can be activated."
- 2021–2022 – Resolved: The United States Federal Government should substantially increase prohibitions on anticompetitive business practices by the private sector by at least expanding the scope of its core antitrust laws.
- 2022–2023 – "Resolved: The United States should vest legal rights and/or duties in one or more of the following: artificial intelligence, nature, nonhuman animal species."
- 2023–2024 – "Resolved: The United States should restrict its nuclear forces in one or more of the following ways: adopting a nuclear no-first use policy; eliminating one or more of the legs of its nuclear triad; disarming its nuclear forces."
- 2024–2025 – "Resolved: The United States Federal Government should adopt a clean energy policy for decarbonization in the United States, including a market-based instrument."
- 2025–2026 – "Resolved: The United States Federal Government should substantially strengthen collective bargaining rights for workers in the United States."

== See also ==
- Competitive debate in the United States
- National Debate Tournament (NDT)
- Open CaseList
