= E. Gordon Gee =

American academic administrator

Gordon Gee
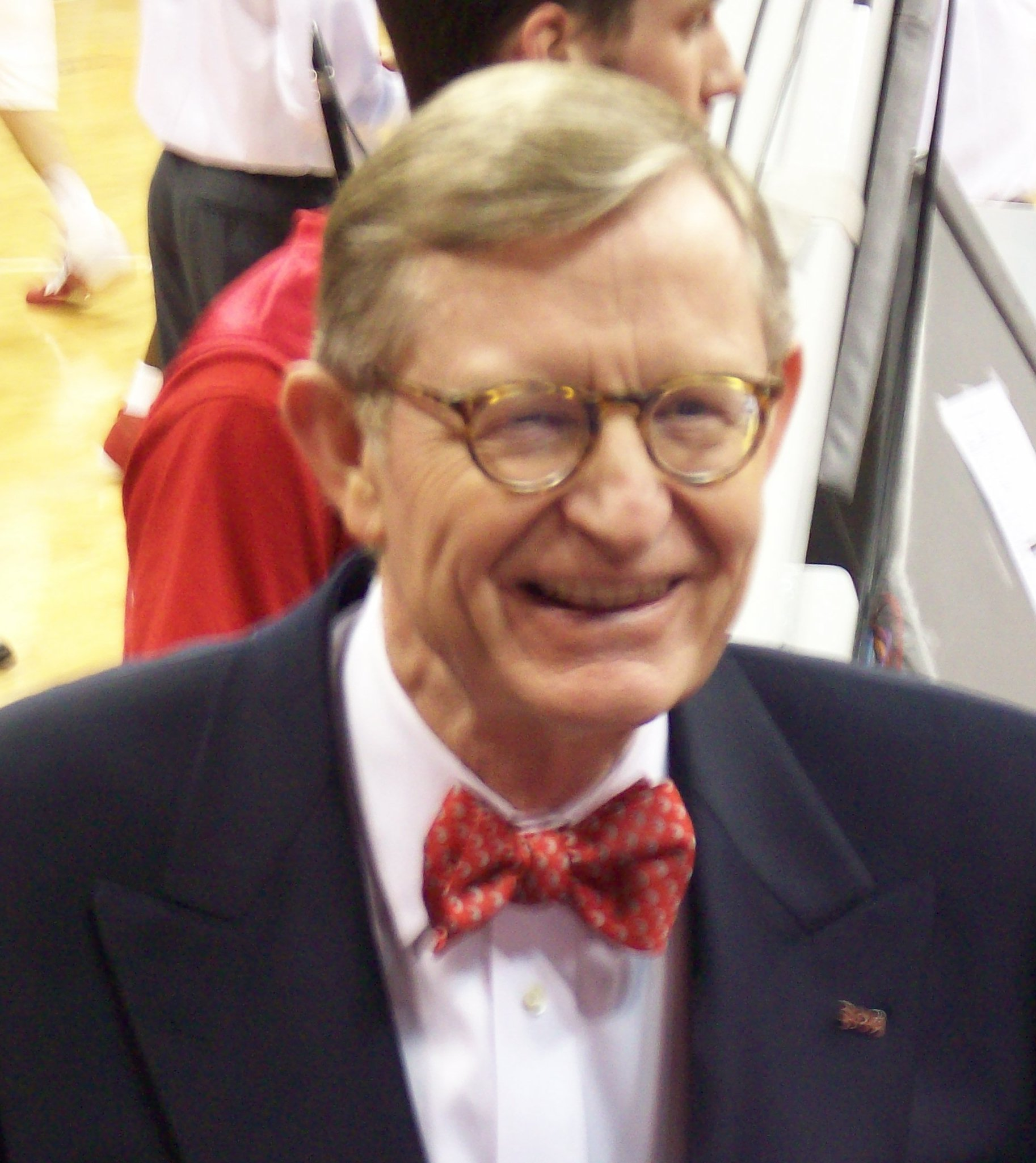
- Gee in 2007

19th and 26th President of West Virginia University
- In office January 1, 2014 – July 15, 2025
- Preceded by: James P. Clements
- Succeeded by: Michael T. Benson
- In office July 1, 1981 – June 30, 1985
- Preceded by: Harry Heflin
- Succeeded by: Diane Reinhard (acting)

11th and 14th President of Ohio State University
- In office October 1, 2007 – June 30, 2013
- Preceded by: Joseph A. Alutto (acting)
- Succeeded by: Joseph A. Alutto (acting)
- In office September 1, 1990 – January 2, 1998
- Preceded by: Edward H. Jennings
- Succeeded by: John Sisson (acting)

7th Chancellor of Vanderbilt University
- In office July 7, 2000 – August 1, 2007
- Preceded by: Joe B. Wyatt
- Succeeded by: Nicholas S. Zeppos

17th President of Brown University
- In office January 6, 1998 – February 7, 2000
- Preceded by: Vartan Gregorian
- Succeeded by: Ruth Simmons

15th President of the University of Colorado System
- In office 1985–1990
- Preceded by: William Baughn
- Succeeded by: William Baughn

Personal details
- Born: Elwood Gordon Gee; February 2, 1944 (age 82) Vernal, Utah, U.S.
- Spouses: Elizabeth Dutson (m. 1968; died 1991); Constance Bumgarner (m. 1994; div. 2007)
- Children: Rebekah Gee
- Education: University of Utah (BA); Columbia University (JD, EdD)

Academic background
- Thesis: An Examination and Analysis of Public Employment Relations Statutes with Recommendations for Statutory Treatment of Collective Bargaining in Higher Education (1972)
- Doctoral advisor: Walter Sindlinger
- Other advisor: Michael Brick

Elwood Gordon Gee (born February 2, 1944) is an American academic administrator. From 2014 to 2025, he served his second term as president of West Virginia University; his first term there was from 1981 to 1985. Gee is said to have held more university presidencies (or their equivalent titles) than any other American. He was head of University of Colorado Boulder from 1985 to 1990, of Ohio State University from 1990 to 1997, of Brown University from 1998 to 2000, of Vanderbilt University from 2000 to 2007, and of Ohio State University for a second time from 2007 to 2013.

Gee stepped down from the Ohio State presidency in 2013 after controversies about anti-Catholic comments allegedly made about the University of Notre Dame. He headed an Ohio State-based think tank before returning to West Virginia University.

== Early life, education, and early career ==
Gee was born in Vernal, Utah which is southeast of Salt Lake City, the son of an oil company employee and a school teacher. Growing up a Mormon in Vernal, he served a mission in Germany and Italy. He is an Eagle Scout and a recipient of the Distinguished Eagle Scout Award. He attended the University of Utah and graduated with a B.A. in history in 1968. After earning a J.D. from Columbia Law School in 1971 and an Ed.D. from Teachers College, Columbia University in 1972, Gee was named a judicial fellow and staff assistant to the Supreme Court for one year.

After clerking for Chief Justice Warren Burger, Gee accepted a position as professor and associate dean at Brigham Young University. He became dean and professor at West Virginia University's law school in 1979, and president of the university two years later. As president of a university at age 37, he was one of the youngest chief executives in academia at the time.

== Brown University ==
Gee was president of Brown for only two years, and his tenure was mired in controversy. According to The Village Voice and The College Hill Independent, one of the university's campus newspapers, Gee was criticized by students and faculty for treating the school like a Wall Street corporation rather than an Ivy League university, and a controversial $3 million renovation of the Brown presidential residence.

Critics pointed to his decisions to sign off on an ambitious brain science program without consulting the faculty, to sell $80 million in bonds for the construction of a biomedical sciences building, and to cut the university's extremely popular Charleston String Quartet, which many saw as part of Gee's effort to lead the school away from its close but unprofitable relationship with the arts.

Gee left under a storm of criticism in 2000, as members of the Brown community widely accused him of departing from the school after an uncommonly short tenure because of Vanderbilt University's offer of a corporate-level salary and a tenured teaching position for his wife. According to a 2003 article by The Chronicle of Higher Education, Gee was the second highest paid university chief executive in the country with a purported total compensation package of more than $1.3 million.

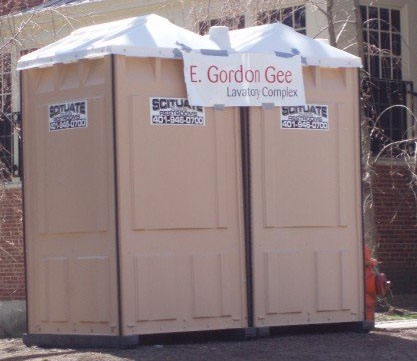
The E. Gordon Gee Lavatory Complex at Brown's Spring Weekend

Gee's tumultuous tenure at Brown is commemorated annually with the "E. Gordon Gee Lavatory Complex," a collection of portable toilets that appears during Spring Weekend.

== Vanderbilt University ==
Gee had high student approval ratings. In 2005, when Gee's approval saw a comparatively sharp drop, it still stood at 88.4%. During his tenure, Vanderbilt saw a dramatic increase in student applications— more than 50% in six years—and a rise in the SAT scores of incoming freshmen. Under his tenure, the university completed a $1.25 billion fundraising campaign two years ahead of schedule.

A September 2006 The Wall Street Journal article detailed that some of Gee's problems at Vanderbilt—including his wife's actions (such as smoking marijuana in the chancellor's official residence), criticism of the high cost of renovating his home, and the couple's lavish spending—had come back to haunt him. Additionally, Gee's 2002 announcement that the administration was going to rename Confederate Memorial Hall without the word Confederate provoked a series of lawsuits. While Vanderbilt's board expressed some concern about Gee's spending, they also strongly endorsed his successful leadership. According to the Chronicle of Higher Education, he received a total compensation of over $1.8 million in 2005/6, the highest of any continuing university president in the United States.

On March 11, 2003, a student satirical publication at Vanderbilt, The Slant, ran a complete mock-up of The Vanderbilt Hustler, entitled The Vanderbilt Huslter, with the headline "GEE DEAD". The hoax received some attention from national media, including an appearance on the Drudge Report. Gee's office responded to the hoax by releasing a photo of him holding a copy of the Hustler (with Gee smiling). Despite Gee's good humor about the prank, a controversy ensued.

In September 2003, Gee made national headlines when he eliminated the organized athletic department at Vanderbilt and consolidated its activities under the Division of Student Life, the university's general administrative division for student organizations and activities. Some critics cited this reorganization in the recruiting process to call into question Vanderbilt's commitment to football. However, Gee's action had its supporters, including NCAA President Myles Brand. Furthermore, a stellar spring for Vanderbilt athletic teams and a top-30 finish in the National Association of Collegiate Directors of Athletics (NACDA) Director's Cup ranking of college athletic programs for the 2003–04 academic year provided some vindication for Vanderbilt and Gee.

== Ohio State University ==
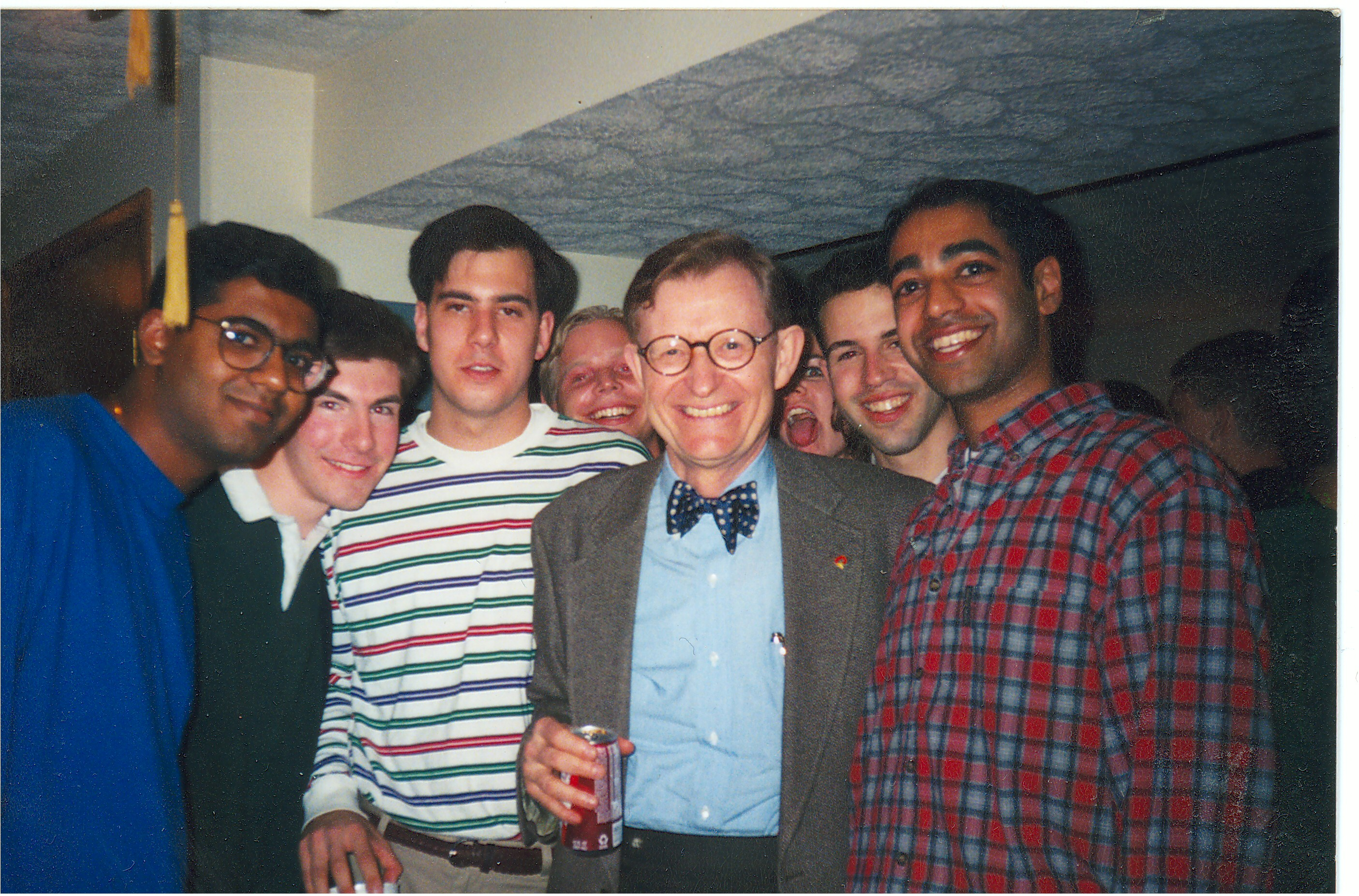
Gee with Ohio State University Students circa 1995–96

On July 11, 2007, Gee announced that he would be returning to Ohio State University as its president, ending his 7-year tenure at Vanderbilt. According to The Chronicle of Higher Education, he was to receive a base salary of total compensation of over $1 million, the highest of any public university president in the United States, though less than his pay at Vanderbilt.

Controversy arose over Gee's alleged usage of public money to live an extravagant lifestyle. The Dayton Daily News of Dayton, Ohio, reported that "Ohio State has spent more than $64,000 on bow ties, bow tie cookies and O-H and bow tie pins for Gee and others to distribute."

Gee repeatedly came under fire from the media following public statements of his. In 2010, Gee stated, when talking about the rather weaker schedules of mid-major football programs at Boise State and Texas Christian University compared to the schedules of Ohio State and other Big Ten and SEC programs, "I do know, having been both a Southeastern Conference president and a Big Ten president, that it's like murderers' row every week for these schools. We do not play the Little Sisters of the Poor. We play very fine schools on any given day". Gee would later apologize for his comments about this well established Catholic religious order, which has been operating in the United States since 1868. He later visited the Little Sisters of the Poor, and claimed he did not know about the organization when he made the comments. TCU ended up getting the last laugh, winning the 2011 Rose Bowl; following the win, a group of TCU alumni paid for space on several digital billboards in the Columbus area in which the "Little Sisters of the Poor" congratulated TCU on its victory.

In 2011, Gee came under fire again for anti-Polish sentiment after comparing being the president at Ohio State to running the Polish army. Gee would later regret making the comment after Polish-American groups strongly responded to his joke about their ethnicity. In response to Gee's remarks, the Polish American Congress demand Gee apologize for "his slur on the military of a nation that has been fighting valiantly and effectively alongside the United States" and for "bigotry and ignorance expressed by the president of such a large and prominent American university, especially since Ohio has a large Polish-American population and many OSU students are of Polish heritage."

In December 2012 Gee made further offensive anti-Catholic statements. Gee said that the University of Notre Dame should not be added to the Big Ten:

I negotiated with them during my first term and the fathers are holy on Sunday and they're holy hell on the rest of the week. You just can't trust those damn Catholics on a Thursday or Friday.

On March 11, 2013, Ohio State University trustees sent Gee a letter complaining that he had embarrassed the school with his comments. The anti-defamation chair of the Ancient Order of Hibernians responded with shock that it took six months for Gee to apologize, saying that "this delayed action smacks of damage control for the media, rather than a sincere effort to address a bigoted insult to Catholics."

Bill Donohue of the Catholic League took a more sympathetic tack regarding the issue: "It's time for everyone to take a deep breath," he commented. "I have never met President Gee, but it is clear from what I read that what he said was made in jest. Was it dumb? ... yes. But context and tone matter, as does the frequency of what may be considered an offensive remark: a real bigot is someone who repeatedly, and maliciously, attacks others. Gee is not such a man. Political correctness has gone too far."

The Ohio State trustees also felt that Gee made insensitive public comments about the University of Cincinnati, University of Kentucky, University of Louisville, and the Southeastern Conference. The letter laid out the steps Gee must take, which included issuing personal apologies and obtaining professional help to improve personal communications and speech writing processes. Shortly thereafter, the full text of Gee's remarks became public, and it was revealed that during the same speech, he had also taken shots at former Wisconsin football head coach Bret Bielema, saying "[Wisconsin athletic director] Barry Alvarez thought he was a thug." When asked about the SEC and Louisville saying the Big Ten couldn't count after the conference added Maryland and Rutgers during the early-2010s conference realignment to expand the conference to 14 teams, Gee ridiculed the academic standards of Louisville and the SEC schools, saying once they "learned to read and write", they could start thinking about conference expansion. Gee released an official apology and called his words a poor attempt at humor.

Gee's base salary was $802,125, with a total compensation package of $1.6 million. In 2009, he donated a $200,531 bonus and his $20,053 raise to scholarship funds. In 2013, Gee earned $6,057,615 from Ohio State University.

On June 4, 2013, Gee announced his retirement. In a news release, he said, "After much deliberation, I have decided it is now time for me to turn over the reins of leadership to allow the seeds that we have planted to grow. It is also time for me to reenergize and refocus myself."

== West Virginia University ==
On December 5, 2013, West Virginia University announced that Gee would become its interim president until the search for a permanent president concluded. Following an endorsement by the West Virginia University presidential search committee on February 28, 2014, on March 3, the WVU Board of Governors at WVU dropped the "interim" tag from Gee's title and named him WVU's 24th permanent president. In August 2023, Gee announced a plan to shutter 10% of the university's majors, eliminate all language teaching, and fire 16% of its faculty, to address a budget crunch caused largely by the ill-fated expansion program that he previously pushed.

On September 6, 2023, the Faculty Assembly of the university passed a symbolic vote of no confidence resolution against Gee, citing his plans to cut faculty and majors. Similarly, in December 2023, the University Assembly published a no confidence vote against Gee, by a vote of 797 to 100.

Gee left the presidency following his contract's expiration in June 2025.

== Personal life ==
Gee is a member of The Church of Jesus Christ of Latter-day Saints.

Gee has been married twice. His first wife was Elizabeth D. Gee, with whom he had one daughter, Rebekah Gee. Gordon and his daughter were featured on an episode of the public radio show This American Life discussing life after Elizabeth's death. Gee divorced his second wife, Constance Bumgarner Gee, in 2007. During the summer of 2016, Gee became engaged to Laurie Erickson of the Erickson Foundation. Gee's daughter Rebekah was appointed Secretary of the Louisiana Department of Health and Hospitals in 2016.

In 2001, Gee received the Judge Elbert P. Tuttle Distinguished Achievement Award, the highest recognition of achievement in the Pi Kappa Alpha International fraternity. In 2012, Gee became the first Honorary Esteemed Member of the University of Colorado's Buff Bow Tie Bunch (BBTB).

Gee has donated more than $10,000 to Democratic and Republican political campaigns since 2010.

Gee served on the board of directors of L Brands.

== See also ==
- List of presidents of West Virginia University

Academic offices
Preceded by Harry Heflin	President of West Virginia University; 1981–1985	Succeeded by Diane Reinhard; Acting
Preceded by William Baughn	President of the University of Colorado System; 1985–1990	Succeeded by William Baughn
Preceded by Edward H. Jennings	President of Ohio State University; 1990–1998	Succeeded by John Sisson; Acting
Preceded by Vartan Gregorian	President of Brown University; 1998–2000	Succeeded by Ruth Simmons
Preceded by Joe B. Wyatt	Chancellor of Vanderbilt University; 2000–2007	Succeeded by Nicholas S. Zeppos
Preceded by Joseph A. Alutto; Acting	President of Ohio State University; 2007–2013	Succeeded by Joseph A. Alutto; Acting
Preceded by James P. Clements	President of West Virginia University; 2014–2025	Succeeded by Michael T. Benson
