= Stanley Wolpert =

American Indologist

- Born: December 23, 1927; Brooklyn, New York, U.S.
- Died: February 19, 2019 (aged 91)
- Education: City College of New York (BA); University of Pennsylvania (MA, PhD)
- Occupation: Indologist
- Notable work: Morley and India Nineteen Six to Nineteen Ten (1967); Jinnah of Pakistan (1984)

Stanley Albert Wolpert (December 23, 1927 – February 19, 2019) was an American historian, Indologist, and author. He wrote both fiction and non-fiction on the political and intellectual history of modern India and Pakistan. He taught at the University of California, Los Angeles (UCLA), from 1959 to 2002.

== Biography ==
=== Early life ===
Stanley Albert Wolpert was born on December 23, 1927, in Brooklyn, New York, to Russian Jewish parents. While serving as an engineer aboard a U.S. Merchant Marine ship, he arrived in Bombay, India, for the first time on February 12, 1948. Upon arriving, he was both fascinated by the outpouring of grief over the death of Mahatma Gandhi—whom he then knew very little about—two weeks earlier. On returning home, he abandoned his career in marine engineering for the study of Indian history. He received a B.A. from City College of New York in 1953, and an M.A. and Ph.D. from the University of Pennsylvania in 1955 and 1959, respectively. His dissertation (published as Tilak and Gokhale) was on the revolutionary and reform wings of the Indian National Congress. The dissertation was one of the two books selected for the Watumull Prize of the American Historical Association in 1962, a prize recognizing "the best book on the history of India originally published in the United States."

=== Career ===
Wolpert began his academic career in 1959, when he took a job as an instructor in the Department of History at UCLA. He was promoted in 1960 to assistant professor; in 1963 to associate professor; and in 1967 to full professor. In 1968 he was appointed department chair. He was later an emeritus professor.

Wolpert's book Nine Hours to Rama was adapted to a feature film in 1963.

In 1975 Wolpert was awarded UCLA's Distinguished Teaching Award.

Wolpert was a guest on Connie Martinson Talks Books in 2011, promoting his 2010 book, India and Pakistan: Continued Conflict or Cooperation.

=== Personal life and death ===
He married Dorothy Wolpert (née Guberman) on June 12, 1953. They met in an American government class at City College of New York. She went on to become a senior partner in a Century City law firm, and made several visits to India with her husband. They had two sons and three grandchildren.

Wolpert died on February 19, 2019.

== Bibliography ==
=== Jinnah of Pakistan ===
Among Wolpert's most well-known works is Jinnah of Pakistan (1982), the first full-length biography compiled on Muhammad Ali Jinnah, the founder of Pakistan. The book is regarded as one of the most authentic biographical books on the life of Jinnah.

=== Congress and Indian Nationalism: The Pre-Independence Phase ===
Wolpert served as editor, alongside John Richard Sisson, of the volume of papers presented at the UCLA March 1984 international conference on the pre-Independence phase of the Indian National Congress, published by the University of California Press.

Participating scholars in the conference included Judith M. Brown, Basudev Chatterji, Eugene F. Irschick, Raghavan N. Iyer, Anthony Low, Thomas R. Metcalf, Gyanendra Pandey, Bimal Prasad, Barbara N. Ramusack, Rajat Kanta Ray, Sumit Sarkar, Eleanor Zelliot, and others.

=== Gandhi's Passion: The Life and the Legacy of Mahatma Gandhi ===
Published in 2001, Gandhi's Passion is a biography of Mahatma Gandhi.Delhi University historian Shahid Amin in his review for the Outlook, called it an "empathetic and meticulous biography." The biography was criticised by columnist Swapan Dasgupta, who wrote in India Today: "Wolpert's biography is not the work of a professional historian [...] It is essentially a sympathetic assessment, a study of Gandhi the saint that only tangentially — and with some glaring factual inaccuracies [...] and sweeping over-generalisations takes into account the environment he operated in."

Pankaj Mishra, in his review for The New York Times, described it as a "somewhat perfunctory biography." He wrote, "the best that can be said about Wolpert's book is that while it tells you nothing about Gandhi that hasn't been said before, it doesn't oversimplify its subject." He further added, "Disappointingly, he doesn't go into the manifold ways Gandhi's distrust of modernity has found echoes among many political and environmental movements around the world."

Ahmed Abbas in his review for Strategic Studies, called the book "a valuable addition to the literature on the contemporary history of the Indian subcontinent." Diplomat and author Shashi Tharoor in his review for The Washington Post called it "a smooth, highly readable but flawed book." He added: "Wolpert's narrative is rather bloodless; the characters on its pages are largely just names, with little physical description, social background or political context provided. [...] The book is riddled with minor errors unworthy of a historian of Wolpert's eminence [...] Wolpert gives us the saint, but the shrewd politician is little in evidence in this book. And yet Wolpert gets all the essentials right, and he does so in lucid and lively prose."

=== Shameful Flight: The Last Years of the British Empire in India ===
Published in 2006, Shameful Flight is a chronological study of the last days of the British Empire in India from the Fall of Singapore to the India–Pakistan war of 1947–1948.

Columnist Swapan Dasgupta in his review for The Times of India criticised Wolpert's "central argument" for mirroring "the misgivings of the relics of the pre-War Conservative Party to the management of decolonization." Yet, he refused to lump Wolpert in with the Conservative revisionist historians and called his central thesis "intriguing".

== Publications ==
=== Non-fiction ===
- Tilak and Gokhale: Revolution and Reform in the Making of Modern India (1962)
- Morley and India, 1906-1910 (1967)
- A New History of India (1977)
- Roots of Confrontation in South Asia: Afghanistan, Pakistan, India and the Superpowers (1982)
- Jinnah of Pakistan (1984)
- Congress and Indian Nationalism: The Pre-Independence Phase (as co-editor with Richard Sisson) (1988)
- India (1991)
- Zulfi Bhutto of Pakistan: His Life and Times (1993)
- Nehru: A Tryst With Destiny (1996)
- Gandhi's Passion: The Life and the Legacy of Mahatma Gandhi (2001)
- Encyclopedia of India (as editor) (2005)
- Shameful Flight:The Last Years of British Empire in India (2006)
- India and Pakistan: Continued Conflict or Cooperation (2010)

=== Fiction ===
- Aboard the Flying Swan (1954)
- Nine Hours to Rama (1962)
- The Expedition: A Novel (1967)
- An Error of Judgment (1970)
