= Andrew Cayton =

Scholar of early American history (1954–2015)

Andrew Robert Lee Cayton
- Education: Brown; University of Virginia
- Scientific career
- Fields: North American history
- Workplaces: Ohio State University; Miami (Ohio); Ball State
- Doctoral advisor: Gordon S. Wood

Andrew Robert Lee "Drew" Cayton (May 9, 1954 – December 17, 2015) was a scholar of early American history.

== Career ==
Cayton taught at Harvard, Wellesley, Ball State University, and, from 1990 to 2015, at Miami University of Oxford, Ohio. In 2015 he was appointed Warner Woodring Chair in History at the Ohio State University. He has been the John Adams (Fulbright) Professor of American Studies at Leiden University in the Netherlands; a fellow of the Rockefeller Foundation Center at Bellagio, Italy; and a resident fellow at the Robert H. Smith International Center for Jefferson Studies in Monticello, Virginia; and was the 2012–2013 Frank H. Kenan Fellow at the National Humanities Center in Research Triangle Park, North Carolina.

He has received teaching awards from the Associated Student Government of Miami University, the College of Arts and Science of Miami University, and the Ohio Academy of History, and was a Distinguished Lecturer of the Organization of American Historians.

Cayton received his B.A. in 1976 from the University of Virginia, where he was elected to Phi Beta Kappa shortly before graduation. He went on to earn his M.A. and Ph.D. from Brown in 1981, working under the direction of Gordon Wood. Cayton has been called the "premier modern historian of the American Midwest" and is also well known for his work on British North America. In addition he was interested in Atlantic world history. In 2011–2012, he served as president for the Society for Historians of the Early American Republic (SHEAR) and in 2015 as president of the Ohio Academy of History. In 2013 he published Love at the Time of Revolution: Transatlantic Literary Radicalism and Historical Change, 1793–1818. Cayton wrote with Fred Anderson in 2005, The Dominion of War: Empire and Liberty in North America, 1500-2000. He regularly reviewed books for The New York Times.

He edited, (i) with John Richard Sisson and Christian Zacher in 2007, The American Midwest: An Interpretive Encyclopedia; (ii) with Stuart D. Hobbs in 2005, The Center of a Great Empire: The Ohio Country in the Early Republic; and (iii) with Susan E. Gray in 2001, The American Midwest: Essays on Regional History.

== Family ==
Cayton was born in Cincinnati, Ohio, on May 9, 1954, son of Robert Frank Cayton (1929–2004), a librarian at Marietta College, and Vivian Irene Pelley (maiden; 1929–2014), a high school teacher in the Marietta City School District. Andrew Cayton – on August 23, 1975, in Charlottesville, Virginia – married Mary Alice Kupiec (maiden), a historian. They had two daughters, Elizabeth Renanne Cayton and Hannah Kupiec Cayton.

=== Death ===
Andrew Cayton died of cancer on December 17, 2015, in Columbus, Ohio.

== Publications ==
- The Frontier Republic: Ideology and Politics in the Ohio Country, 1780–1825. Kent State University Press. 1986 – via Internet Archive. LCCN 86-4706; ISBN 978-0-8733-8332-5, 0-8733-8332-X (hardcover; 1986), ISBN 978-0-8733-8409-4, 0-8733-8409-1 (paperback; 1989)
- The Midwest and the Nation: Rethinking the History of an American Region. Indiana University Press. 1990 – via Internet Archive (limited preview). LCCN 89-45479; ISBN 978-0-2533-1525-0, 0-2533-1525-5 – with Peter S. Onuf.
- Frontier Indiana: A History of the Trans-Appalachian Frontier. Indiana University Press. 1996. LCCN 95-26443; ISBN 978-0-2533-3048-2, 0-2533-3048-3 (1st ed.; 1996), ISBN 978-0-2532-1217-7, 0-2532-1217-0 (2nd ed., paperback; 1998).
1. Via Google Books (limited preview).
- Contact Points: American Frontiers from the Mohawk Valley to the Mississippi. UNC Press. 1998. LCCN 97-49510; ISBN 0-8078-2427-5 (hard cover), ISBN 0-8078-4734-8 (paperback) – edited with Fredrika Johanna Teute.
1. Via Internet Archive (limited preview).
2. Via Google Books (limited preview).
- Ohio: The History of a People. The Ohio State University Press. 2002 – via Internet Archive. LCCN 2001-7350; ISBN 978-0-8142-0899-1, 0-8142-0899-1.
- The Dominion of War: Empire and Liberty in North America, 1500–2000. Viking. 2005 – via Internet Archive (limited preview). LCCN 2004-295398; ISBN 978-0-1430-3651-7, 0-1430-3651-3, ISBN 978-0-6700-3370-6, 0-6700-3370-7 – with Fred Anderson.

A "History Book Club Selection," a "Washington Post Best Book of 2005," and a "2005 Book of the Year" in The Times Literary Supplement.

- Love in the Time of Revolution – Transatlantic Literary Radicalism and Historical Change, 1793–1818. UNC Press. 2013 – via Google Books (limited preview). LCCN 2013-2815; ISBN 978-1-4696-0750-4, 1-4696-0750-6; OCLC 829239348 (all editions).

== Bibliography ==
=== References ===
- Cincinnati Enquirer, The (December 21, 2015). "Ohio–Indiana Obituaries: Cayton". Vol. 175, no. 256. p. 15 (section A).
1. Via Newspapers.com.
2. Via Legacy.com.
3. Via Legacy.com.
- Cummings, David; Jacobson, Tanjam (née Tanjam Narasimhan), eds. (1995). "Cayton, Andrew Robert Lee". The International Authors and Writers Who's Who (14th ed.). Cambridge: International Biographical Centre – via Internet Archive. LCCN 76-642843; ISSN 0143-8263; ISBN 978-0-9488-7581-6, 0-9488-7581-X; OCLC 32636801
- OSU (2015). "OSU Department of History: Andrew Cayton". Department of History, Ohio State University. Archived from the original on March 13, 2016.
- Wood, Gordon Stewart (2009). Empire of Liberty: A History of the Early Republic, 1789–1815. Oxford University Press. p. 745 – via Internet Archive (limited preview). LCCN 2009-10762; ISBN 978-0-1950-3914-6 (hardcover); ISBN 978-0-1998-3246-0 (paperback).
"Andrew R.L. Cayton became the premier modern historian of the early Midwest."
