= The Half Known Life =

2023 book by Pico Iyer

The Half Known Life: In Search of Paradise
- Author: Pico Iyer
- Publisher: Penguin Books
- Publication date: January 23, 2023

The Half Known Life: In Search of Paradise is a book by Pico Iyer which was published on January 23, 2023, by Penguin Books.

== Critical reception and reviews ==
Nikhil Krishnan of The Daily Telegraph rated The Half Known Life one out of five stars.

Bilal Qureshi of The Washington Post wrote "“The Half Known Life” is a masterful merging of Iyer’s past and current concerns, a book of inner journeys told through extraordinary exteriors, of hopeful optimism for a world rooted in the paradise of being home.".

The book has been reviewed by Mark Epstein of The New York Times, Tim Adams of The Guardian, Danny Heitman of The Wall Street Journal, Mini Kapoor of The Hindu, Caroline Eden of Financial Times, Thúy Đinh of National Public Radio and Paul Clement of The Irish Times.
