= Kelly Mezurek =

American academic (born 1961)

Kelly D. Mezurek
- Born: Ohio, United States
- Occupations: Professor of humanities, Walsh University
- Known for: Author of For Their Own Cause: The 27th United States Colored Troops; recipient of the Nau Civil War Fellowship, University of Virginia (2019)

Kelly D. Mezurek (born 1961) is a professor of humanities at Walsh University in North Canton, Ohio whose research and writing has focused on nineteenth-century American History. A leading expert on the military service of African Americans during the American Civil War, she is the author of the book, For Their Own Cause: The 27th United States Colored Troops, which was published by The Kent State University Press in 2016.

A finalist for the Ohioana Book Award for nonfiction in 2017, she was awarded the Nau Civil War Fellowship at the University of Virginia in 2019.

== Formative years ==
Born in the United States in the state of Ohio in 1961, Kelly D. Mezurek is a daughter of the late Carl Joel Mezurek (1941–2001) and Carol Mae (Hadsell) Mezurek (1941–1922).

Mezurek earned her Bachelor of Arts degree in history at Baldwin-Wallace College (now Baldwin Wallace University) in Berea, Ohio, followed by a Master of Arts in public history and Doctor of Philosophy in nineteenth-century United States history from Kent State University in Kent, Ohio. In 2019, she was appointed by the University of Virginia to serve as its Nau Civil War fellow. In 2022, she served as one of the scholarly research fellows for the Kentucky Historical Society.

== Academic career ==
Hired by Walsh University as an adjunct faculty member in the department of history in 2000, Mezurek was promoted to assistant professor in 2008 and was subsequently appointed as a professor in the humanities division. Her current teaching responsibilities include the planning and presentation of upper-level history classes for social studies majors, as well as general-level history education classes for other members of the student body.

== Publications and presentations ==
=== Publications ===
An abridged list of Mezurek's published work and presentations includes:

- For Their Own Cause: The 27th United States Colored Troops. Kent, Ohio: The Kent State University Press, 2016.
- “Civil War Incarceration in History and Memory: A Roundtable,” in Civil War History, vol. 63, no. 3 (September 2017). Kent, Ohio: The Kent State University Press, 2017.
- “Dear Mother: The Letters of William C. Quantrill to his Mother Caroline, 1885-1860.” Dover, Ohio: Dover Historical Society, 2017.
- ‘“De Bottom Rails on Top Now”: Black Union Guards and Confederate Prisoners of War,” in Crossing the Deadlines: Civil War Prisons Reconsidered, Michael P. Gray, editor. Kent, Ohio: The Kent State University Press, October 2018.
- “The Colored Veteran Soldiers Should Receive the Same Tender Care: Black Veterans, Soldiers’ Homes, and the Post-Civil War Midwest,” in The War Went On: Reconsidering the Lives of Civil War Veterans, Brian Matthew Jordan and Evan C. Rothera, editors. Baton Rouge, Louisiana: Louisiana State University Press, April 2020.

=== Presentations ===
- “African Americans, Race, and Abraham Lincoln at the End of the Civil War.” New York, New York: The Gilder Lehrman Institute of American History, July 24, 2024.
- “Civil War Era Letters: Digital Research, Pedagogy, and Scholarship.” Paper presented: Phi Alpha Theta Biennial Conference (New Orleans, Louisiana. January 4, 2018). Tampa, Florida: Phi Alpha Theta History Honor Society.
- “They Were More Than ‘Lucky’: Black Veterans, Their Choices, Their Rights, and Their Presence in the National Home for Disabled Volunteer Soldiers System.” Paper presented: 103rd Annual Meeting, Association for the Study of African American Life and History (Indianapolis, Indiana, October 4, 2018). Washington, D.C.: Association for the Study of African American Life and History.
- ‘“Since I have put on Lincoln blue’: The Personal Military Experiences of Black Civil War Soldiers Expressed in their Private Letters Home.” Paper presented: 86th Annual Meeting of the Society for Military History. Columbus, Ohio: The Ohio State University, May 10, 2019.
- “‘Passed from the Hands of His Friends to the Soldiers’ Home’: Black Civil War Veterans and the Southern Branches of the NHDVS.” Louisville, Kentucky: 85th Annual Meeting, Southern Historical Association, November 9, 2019.

== Academic and public service ==
Mezurek has been involved in multiple academic and public service activities throughout her career, including:

- Constitution Day (current program coordinator, Walsh University)
- National Veterans Memorial and Museum, Columbus, Ohio (content reviewer)
- Ohio Academy of History (former executive board member)
- Ohio Civil War 150 (advisory committee member)
- Ohio Humanities (speakers' bureau member, 2010-present)
- Phi Alpha Theta (current advisor, Alpha Nu Sigma chapter, Walsh University)
