= Judith Sealander =

American historian and professor

Judith Sealander is an American historian and professor. She is Professor of History at Bowling Green State University.

== Education ==
Sealander received a Ph.D. in history in 1977 from Duke University.

== Career ==
Sealander has researched women's history, business and educational progressivism and philanthropy. She has studied American government efforts to promote health, opportunity and security to children and pronounces them as failures.

Before teaching at Bowling Green State University, she taught at Wright State University.

She is a recipient of the 1998 Ohio Academy of History Outstanding Publication Award. Sealander is also the recipient of numerous awards from the National Endowment for the Humanities, American Association of Colleges, Rockefeller Archive Center, and the Indiana University Center for the Study of Philanthropy.

== Publications ==
Sealander, Judith (2005, forthcoming) "The Rockefeller Legacy and Medical Reform," Philanthropy in the United States, Dwight Burlingame, ed., ABC-CLIO.

Sealander, Judith (2005, forthcoming) "Perpetually Malnourished"? The Birth of Nutrition Science and the Problem of Child Feeding in the United States," Children's Health in History: International Perspectives, Cheryl Warsh and Veronica Strong-Boag, eds., Wilfrid Laurier University Press, [Canada].

Sealander, Judith (2005, forthcoming) Introduction to L. P. Brockett, The Philanthropic Results of War (original issue: 1863), Harvard University, Hauser Center for Nonprofit Organization, Landmarks in Philanthropy: A Republication Project.

Sealander, Judith (2006, forthcoming) "Discipline and Order," Competing Modernities: The United States and Germany, 1890–1960, Christof Mauch and Dirk Schumann, eds., Cambridge University Press.

Sealander, Judith. Forthcoming 2005. Senior Editor, "The Midwest and Civic Culture." Encyclopedia of the Midwest, Indiana University Press.

Sealander, Judith. Forthcoming 2005. "Philanthropists and Philanthropy." In Encyclopedia of New England Culture, Burt Feintuch, Suzanne Guiod, and David Watters (Eds.). Yale University Press.

Sealander, Judith. "Brother, Can You Spare a Dime? Depression-Era Charitable Giving." In Encyclopedia of the Great Depression, James Ciment (author), Armonk, N.Y : Sharpe Reference; 2001

Sealander, Judith. 2003 The Failed Century of the Child: Governing America's Young in the Twentieth Century. Cambridge University Press.

Sealander, Judith. 2002. "'Curing Evils at Their Source': The Arrival of Scientific Giving," In American Philanthropy, Lawrence Friedman and Mark McGarvie (Eds.), Cambridge University Press.

Sealander, Judith. 2001. "American Foundations and Philanthropy." In Encyclopedia of American Cultural and Intellectual History, M. Cayton and P.Williams (Eds.), Scribners.

Sealander, Judith. Grand Plans: Business Progressivism and Social Change in Ohio's Miami Valley, 1890-1920 (Lexington: University Press of Kentucky, 1988).
