= John Richard Sisson =

American historian (born 1936)

John Richard Sisson (born October 16, 1936) was the acting President of Ohio State University from December 15, 1997, to June 30, 1998, after Elwood Gordon Gee left the office.

Sisson graduated from Ohio State with a Bachelor of Arts in international studies in 1958 and a Master of Arts in political science in 1960. He went on to the University of California, Berkeley and received a Ph.D. in 1967. After completing his education, Sisson held administrative and academic positions at the United States Military Academy, UCLA, and Ohio State University. At Ohio State Sisson was Provost from 1993 to 1998. Sisson returned to teaching comparative politics at Ohio State University until his retirement in 2002. In 2002 the political science department at Ohio State University honored Sisson as its "Distinguished Alumnus". of the year.

Sisson served as editor alongside Stanley Wolpert of the volume of papers presented at the University of California, Los Angeles March 1984 international conference on the pre Independent phase of the Indian National Congress and published by the University of California Press.

Participating scholars in the conference include Dilip K. Basu, Judith M. Brown, Basudev Chatterji, Walter Huser, Stephen Northrup Hay, Eugene Irschick, Raghavan N. Iyer, D. A. Low, James Manor, Claude Markovits, John R. McLane, Thomas R. Metcalf, W. H. Morris Jones, V. A. Narain, Norman D. Palmer, Gyanendra Pandey, Bimal Prasad, Barbara N. Ramusack, Rajat Kanta Ray, Peter Reeves, Damodar Sardesai, Sumit Sarkar, Lawrence L. Shrader, William Vanderbok and Eleanor Zelliot.

== Selected publications ==
- The Congress Party in Rajasthan: Political Integration and Institution-building in an Indian State. Berkeley, CA: University of California Press, 1972.
- Congress and Indian Nationalism: The Pre-independence Phase. Berkeley, CA: University of California Press, 1988. (co-edited with Stanley Wolpert).
- War and secession: Pakistan, India, and the creation of Bangladesh. Berkeley, CA: University of California Press, 1991. (co-authored with Leo Rose).
- The Evolution of Political Knowledge: Theory and Inquiry in American Politics. Ohio State University Press, 2004. (co-edited with Edward D. Mansfield).
- The Evolution of Political Knowledge: Democracy, Conflict, and Autonomy in Comparative and International Politics. Ohio State University Press, 2004. (co-edited with Edward D. Mansfield).
- Ohio And The World, 1753-2053: Essays Toward A New History Of Ohio. Ohio State University Press, 2005. (co-edited with Geoffrey Parker and William Russell Coil).
- The American Midwest: An Interpretive Encyclopedia. Indiana University Press, 2006. (co-edited with Andrew R. L. Cayton and Chris Zacher).

Academic offices
Preceded by E. Gordon Gee	Ohio State University President (acting); December 15, 1997 – June 30, 1998	Succeeded by William English Kirwan
