= Constance Bumgarner Gee =

American scholar

- Born: Constance Bumgarner; Raleigh, North Carolina, U.S.
- Education: East Carolina University (BFA); Pratt Institute (MFA); Pennsylvania State University (PhD)
- Occupations: Scholar; memoirist; philanthropist
- Spouse: E. Gordon Gee (m. 1994; div. 2007)

Constance Bumgarner Gee (née Bumgarner) is an American scholar, memoirist, animal rights activist, and advocate of the medical use of cannabis. She was the founder and director of the Arts Policy and Administration Program at Ohio State University, and later an assistant professor at Brown University and tenured associate professor at Vanderbilt University. She is the author of Higher Education: Marijuana at the Mansion, a 2012 memoir about her life as "first lady" of several American research universities. She critiques aspects of university leadership, discussing instances she perceives as inconsistencies between public image and internal practices.

== Early life ==
Constance Bumgarner was born in Raleigh, North Carolina. She graduated from East Carolina University in Greenville, North Carolina, with a bachelor of arts degree in Fine Arts. She then received a master's degree in Fine Arts from the Pratt Institute in New York City. She received a PhD in Arts Education Policy from The Pennsylvania State University in 1993.

== Career ==
Bumgarner Gee was the founder and director of the Arts Policy and Administration Program at Ohio State University in Columbus, Ohio from 1993 to 1997. She was Assistant Professor of Public Policy at Brown University in Providence, Rhode Island from 1998 to 2000. She later became a tenured Associate Professor of Public Policy and Education in the Department of Leadership and Organizations at Vanderbilt University in Nashville, Tennessee. She resigned in 2010.

Bumgarner Gee was the executive editor of the Arts Education Policy Review, a peer-reviewed academic journal, from 1997 to 2010. She also published chapters in scholarly volumes about arts education policy. According to academic Judith Smith Koroscik, one of her scholarly contributions is to not lament "why the public fails to understand and care about the arts, but, as arts educators, to begin with asking and building on what the public does understand and find meaningful about the arts."

Bumgarner Gee published a memoir titled Higher Education: Marijuana at the Mansion in 2012. In it, she recounts her times as the wife of university president Gordon Gee throughout their years at Ohio State, Brown and Vanderbilt universities. She alleges members of Vanderbilt's politically conservative Board of Trust may have retaliated against her by exposing her medical marijuana use to Wall Street Journal reporters to hide their own conflicts of interest and because of her liberal political stances.

== Civic activities ==
Bumgarner Gee served on the boards of the Columbus (OH) Humane Society, Trinity Repertory Company (Providence, RI), the Rhode Island State Arts Council and, in Nashville, on the boards of the Frist Center for the Visual Arts and Actors Bridge Ensemble. She served on the Board of Advisors of the Curb Center for Art, Enterprise, and Public Policy at Vanderbilt University. She also served on the board of Through the Flower, founded by artist Judy Chicago.

Bumgarner Gee is an advocate of the medical use of cannabis. In 2012, she explained to the Nashville-based newspaper The Tennessean as well as the television station WKRN-TV about why she supported its legalization for medical reasons. She testified to the Health Committee of the Tennessee House of Representatives in favor of the Safe Access to Medical Cannabis Act in April 2012. The bill, co-sponsored by state representative Jeanne Richardson and state senator Beverly Marrero and heard by state senator Glen Casada, was axed in the Tennessee Senate.

== Personal life ==
Bumgarner Gee married Gordon Gee in 1994. In 2006, an article published in The Wall Street Journal revealed that she had smoked cannabis inside Braeburn, the chancellor's residence located at 211 Deer Park in Belle Meade owned by Vanderbilt University, to alleviate the intense nausea and other debilitating symptoms of Ménière's disease. As a result of pressures of public life and political fallout from the Journal article, the couple divorced in 2008. She now resides in Westport, Massachusetts where she is engaged in environmental and animal rights activism.

In 2004, Bumgarner Gee was criticized for lowering the flag to half-mast at Braeburn after George W. Bush was re-elected as president of the United States.

== Selected scholarship ==
- Robin Anne Atwood, Robert W. Backoff, Constance Bumgarner Gee. Identifying Characteristics in Excellent Public and Private Nonprofit Arts Organizations: A Comparative Analysis of Three High Performers. Columbus, Ohio: Ohio State University, 1995. 186 pages.
- Bryan Wayne Knicely, Constance Bumgarner Gee. A Strategic Management Assessment of The Palace Theatre and The Palace Cultural Arts Association Marion, Ohio. Columbus, Ohio: Ohio State University, 1996. 206 pages.
- Susan Pauline Genther, Constance Bumgarner Gee. An Investigation of The Impact of The Greater Columbus Arts Council's Artists-In-Schools Program on The Comprehensive Visual Arts Curriculum of Columbus Public Elementary Schools. Columbus, Ohio: Ohio State University, 1996. 364 pages.
