= The Global Soul =

2001 essay collection by Pico Iyer

- Author: Pico Iyer
- Genre: Essay collection
- Publication date: 2001

The Global Soul: Jet Lag, Shopping Malls, and the Search for Home is a 2001 collection of essays by Pico Iyer, reflecting on the increasingly globalized world and the ramifications that this has for him personally. The book belongs in the corpus of travel writing, though its series of chapters often offer a highly introspective view of the author's person-hood.

Iyer travels through California, the Los Angeles airport (a microcosm of a city), Hong Kong, Toronto, Britain, and Japan and discusses the Olympic Games as a force of and for globalism. Through the book, Iyer identifies himself as a global soul, which is an uprooted person who cannot fully adopt a single nationality and often finds themself going through life as a tourist. The book discusses ideas of marginalized cultures, loss of the Real, and the shifting sense of identity that modernity offers.
