= Aflame: Learning from Silence =

2025 book by Pico Iyer

- Author: Pico Iyer
- Publisher: Riverhead Books
- Publication date: January 14, 2025
- Pages: 240
- ISBN: 978-0593420287

Aflame: Learning from Silence is a 2025 memoir by Pico Iyer, published by Riverhead Books. It concerns Iyer's experiences with his many retreats to a hermitage in Big Sur and his reflections on solitude and spirituality. The book was released on January 14, 2025.

== Background ==
Iyer first began retreating to a Benedictine hermitage in Big Sur, located in central California, after his house burned down along with all of his possessions. There, he learned that "solitude was really just a means to community... And that really solitude is a means to the much greater end of compassion and community, and the virtue of my spending time alone was so I could bring much more back to my mother and my bosses and so on." Since his first visit in 1991, Iyer made over a hundred trips to the retreat over the course of three decades.

Iyer noted that although he hasn't identified as a Christian, the Benedictine monks still allowed him to participate and observe in the monastery's practices: "The Catholic monks who don't share my faith open their doors and their hearts absolutely to me and everyone else who doesn't share their fundamental faith but shares their humanity. It's a reminder of how this is all about finding our common humanity."

== Critical reception ==
In a starred review, Publishers Weekly stated "The author brilliantly illuminates philosophical insights about the nature of the self, the world, and how silence serves as a conduit between the two, often in elegant, evocative prose" and concluded, "This is stunning."

Also in a starred review, Kirkus Reviews called the book "Essential reading for anyone interested in the monastic tradition and those who follow it" and concluded, "A lovely complement to the monastic writings of both Thomas Merton and Patrick Leigh Fermor, Iyer's book speaks well to the qualities of those who live both outside and firmly within the daily world and the wisdom, rough and refined, that monks have to offer".

Library Journal called the book "A nice addition to the literature on the blessings of quietude. lyer's observations about people, places, and himself are beautifully written and may offer readers some reassurance about these troubled times."

Shelf Awareness stated that "Pico Iyer offers an assortment of reflections on his love for the Catholic monastery in California he visits to cultivate self-renewal in silence." In particular, the reviewer observed Iyer's effortless structure, as well as his interfacing with his various influences:

Iyer forgoes any attempt at temporal or geographic continuity, slipping effortlessly backward and forward over the years and across the globe at will. He weaves insights from thinkers like Meister Eckhart, Albert Camus, and Thomas Merton into his own reflections and evocative descriptions of the Hermitage's physical surroundings in brief, epigrammatic sections that occasionally partake of the quality of Zen koans.
