= Pico Iyer =

English essayist and novelist (born 1957)

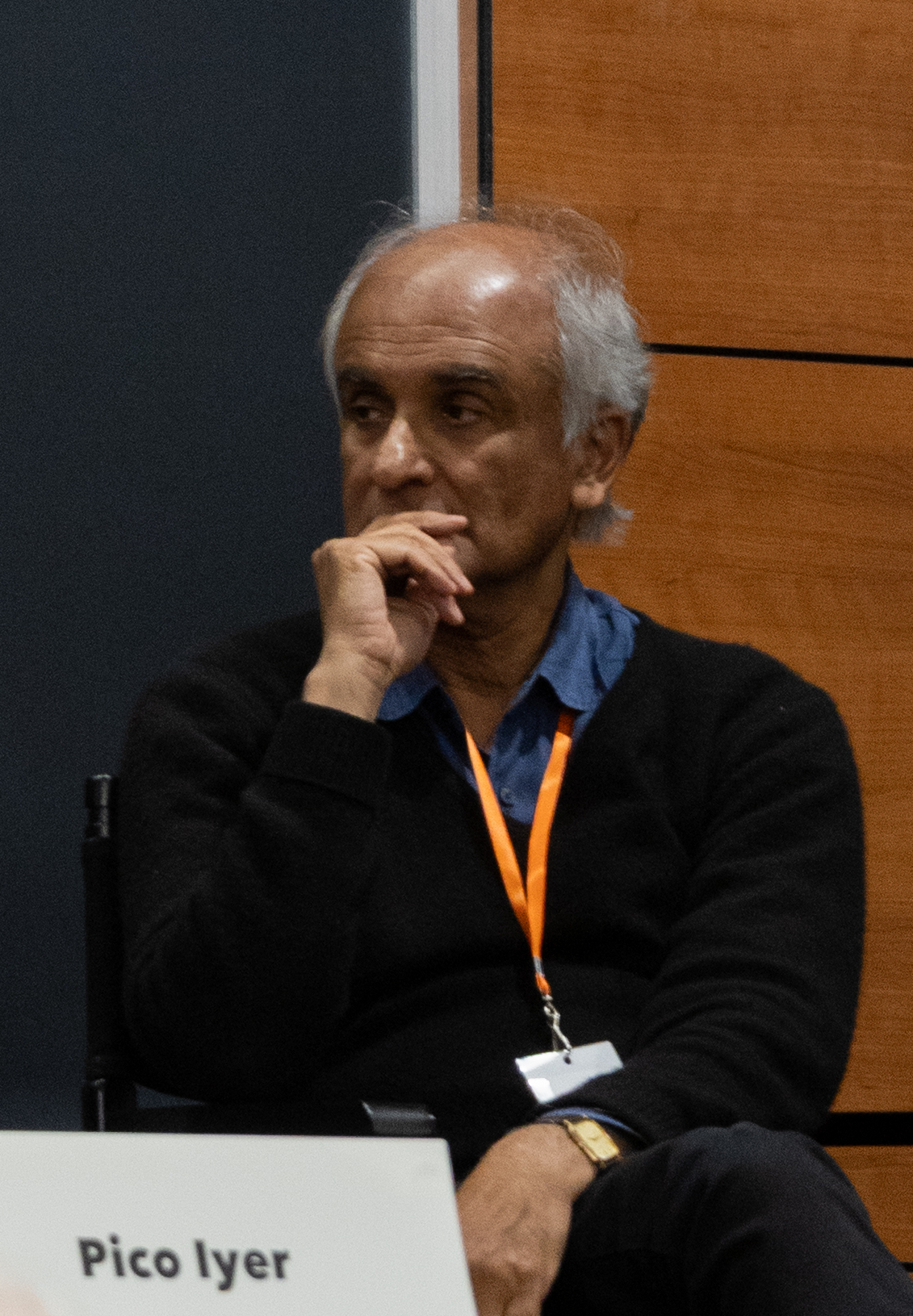
- Iyer in 2025
- Born: Siddharth Pico Raghavan Iyer; 11 February 1957 (age 69); Oxford, England
- Occupations: Essayist, novelist
- Relatives: Raghavan N. Iyer (father, deceased); Nandini Iyer (mother, deceased); Hiroko Takeuchi (wife)
- Writing career
- Genre: Non-fiction/fiction
- Notable awards: Guggenheim Fellowship, 2005 Honorary Doctor of Humane Letters, Chapman University 2017.
- Website: picoiyerjourneys.com

Siddharth Pico Raghavan Iyer (born 11 February 1957), known as Pico Iyer, is an English-born essayist and novelist known chiefly for his travel writing. He is the author of numerous books on crossing cultures including Video Night in Kathmandu, The Lady and the Monk and The Global Soul. He has been a contributor to Time, Harper's, The New York Review of Books, and The New York Times.

== Early life ==
Iyer was born Siddharth Pico Raghavan Iyer in Oxford, England, the son of Indian parents. His father was Raghavan N. Iyer, a philosopher and political theorist then enrolled in doctoral studies at the University of Oxford. His mother was the religious scholar and teacher Nandini Nanak Mehta. He is the great-great-grandson of Indian Gujarati writer Mahipatram Nilkanth. Both of his parents grew up in India then went to England for tertiary education. His name is a combination of the Buddha's name, Siddhartha, and that of the Italian Renaissance philosopher Pico della Mirandola.

When Iyer was seven, in 1964, his family moved to California, when his father started working with the Center for the Study of Democratic Institutions, a California-based think tank, and started teaching at University of California, Santa Barbara. For over a decade, Iyer moved between schools and college in England and his parents' home in California.

He was a King's Scholar at Eton College, and studied at Magdalen College, Oxford and was awarded a congratulatory double first in English literature in 1978. He then received an A.M. in literature from Harvard University in 1980. He received the Oxford MA in 1982.

== Career ==
Iyer taught writing and literature at Harvard before joining Time in 1982 as a writer on world affairs. Since then, he has travelled widely, from North Korea to Easter Island, and from Paraguay to Ethiopia, while writing works of non-fiction and two novels, including Video Night in Kathmandu (1988), The Lady and the Monk (1991), The Global Soul (2000) and The Man Within My Head (2012). He is also a frequent speaker at literary festivals and universities around the world. He delivered popular TED talks in 2013, 2014, 2016 and 2019 and has twice been a Fellow at the World Economic Forum in Davos.

In 2019, he served as Ferris Professor of Journalism at Princeton University, Guest Director of the Telluride Film Festival. He was also the first writer-in-residence at Raffles Hotel Singapore, where he released his book, This Could be Home (2019), which explores Singapore's heritage through its landmarks.

Iyer played Ram Sethi, the fictional head of the International Table Tennis Federation, in Josh Safdie's 2025 sports comedy-drama film Marty Supreme. He was one of a number of non-professional actors portraying characters in the film.

== Writing themes ==
Iyer's writings build on his growing up in a combination of English, American, and Indian cultures. In one of his works, The Global Soul (2000) he takes on the international airport as a central subject, along with associated jet lag, displacement and cultural mingling. As a travel writer, he often writes of living between the cracks and outside fixed categories. Many of his books have been about trying to see from within some society or way of life, but from an outsider's perspective. He has filed stories from Bhutan, Nepal, Ethiopia, Cuba, Argentina, Japan, and North Korea. Some of the topics that he explores in his works include revolution in Cuba, Sufism, Buddhist Kyoto. In his own words from a 1993 article in Harper's, "I am a multinational soul on a multinational globe on which more and more countries are as polyglot and restless as airports. Taking planes seems as natural to me as picking up the phone or going to school; I fold up my self and carry it around as if it were an overnight bag." His writing alternating between the monastery and the airport, Iyer is described by Indian writer Pradeep Sebastian as "Thomas Merton on a frequent flier pass aiming to bring new global energies and possibilities into nonfiction".

His books on the XIVth Dalai Lama, on Graham Greene and on his more than 100 retreats, over 34 years, with a community of Benedictines {Aflame, 2025}, underline his interest in finding an inner base and direction.

Early in his career he wrote numerous pieces on world affairs for Time, including cover stories, and the "Woman of the Year" story on Corazon Aquino in 1986. He has written on literature for The New York Review of Books; on globalism for Harper's; on travel for the Financial Times; and on many other themes for The New York Times, National Geographic, The Times Literary Supplement, contributing up to a hundred articles a year to various publications. He has contributed liner-notes for four Leonard Cohen albums. His books have appeared in 23 languages so far, including Turkish, Russian, and Indonesian. He has also written introductions to more than 100 books, including works by R. K. Narayan, Somerset Maugham, Graham Greene, Michael Ondaatje, Peter Matthiessen, and Isamu Noguchi.

He has appeared seven times in the annual Best Spiritual Writing anthology, and three times in the annual Best American Travel Writing anthology, and has served as guest editor for both. He has also appeared in the Best American Essays anthology.

The Utne Reader named him in 1995 as one of 100 Visionaries worldwide who could change your life, while the New Yorker observed that "As a guide to far-flung places, Pico Iyer can hardly be surpassed."

== Personal life ==
Iyer has been based since 1992 in Nara, Japan, where he lives with his Japanese wife, Hiroko Takeuchi, and her two children from an earlier marriage. His memoir The Lady and the Monk (1991) reflected on his relationship with Takeuchi. He also spends time in California. His family home in Santa Barbara, California, was incinerated by a wildfire in 1990, of which he wrote: "For more and more of us, home has really less to do with a piece of soil, than you could say, with a piece of soul." Asked whether he feels rooted and accepted as a foreigner, Iyer wrote:

Japan is therefore an ideal place because I never will be a true citizen here, and will always be an outsider, however long I live here and however well I speak the language. And the society around me is as comfortable with that as I am. ... I am not rooted in a place, I think, so much as in certain values and affiliations and friendships that I carry everywhere I go; my home is both invisible and portable. But I would gladly stay in this physical location for the rest of my life, and there is nothing in life that I want that it doesn't have.

Iyer met the 14th Dalai Lama in 1974 when he accompanied his father to Dharamshala, India. In discussions about his spirituality, Iyer has said he has no formal meditation practice, but practices regular solitude and visits a remote hermitage near Big Sur several times a year.

== Bibliography ==
=== Books ===
- Iyer, Pico (1984). The Recovery of Innocence. London: Concord Grove Press.
- — (July 1988). Video Night in Kathmandu: and Other Reports from the Not-so-far East. New York: Knopf. ISBN 0-394-55027-7.
- — (August 1991). The Lady and the Monk: Four Seasons in Kyoto. New York: Knopf. ISBN 978-0-679-40308-1.
- — (April 1993). Falling Off the Map: Some Lonely Places of the World. New York: Vintage Books. ISBN 0-679-74612-9.
- — (April 1995). Cuba and the Night: A Novel. New York: Knopf. ISBN 0-679-44052-6.
- — (April 1997). Tropical classical: Essays from Several Directions. New York: A.A. Knopf. ISBN 0-679-45432-2.
- — (February 2000). The Global Soul: Jet Lag, Shopping Malls, and the Search for Home. New York: Knopf. ISBN 0-679-45433-0.
- — (January 2001). Imagining Canada: An Outsider's Hope for a Global Future. Toronto: Hart House, University of Toronto. ISBN 0-9694382-1-4.
- — (April 2004). Abandon: A Romance. New York: Vintage Books. ISBN 1-4000-3085-4.
- — (2004). Sun After Dark: Flights Into the Foreign. New York: Alfred A. Knopf. ISBN 0-375-41506-8.
- — (2008). The Open Road: The Global Journey of the Fourteenth Dalai Lama. New York: Alfred A. Knopf. ISBN 978-0-307-26760-3.
- — (2012). The Man Within My Head. New York: Alfred A. Knopf. ISBN 978-0-307-26761-0.
- — (4 November 2014). The Art of Stillness: Adventures in Going Nowhere. Eydís Einarsdóttir (First TED books hardcover ed.). New York. ISBN 978-1-4767-8472-4.
- — (2019). Autumn Light: Season of Fire and Farewells (First ed.). New York. ISBN 978-0-451-49393-4.
- — (30 July 2019). This Could be Home: Raffles Hotel and the City of Tomorrow. Singapore. ISBN 978-1-912098-55-2.
- — (2 June 2020). A Beginner's Guide to Japan: Observations and Provocations (First Vintage Departures ed.). New York. ISBN 978-1-101-97347-9.
- — (2023). The Half Known Life: In Search of Paradise. New York: Riverhead Books. ISBN 978-0-593-420256.
- — (2025). Aflame: Learning from Silence. Riverhead Books. ISBN 978-0593420287.

=== Essays ===
- Iyer, Pico (12 January 2015). "Whispers from a friend". Outlook. 55 (1): 20–22.

=== Book reviews ===
Year	Review article	Work(s) reviewed
2007	Iyer, Pico (June 28, 2007). "'A new kind of mongrel fiction'". The New York Review of Books. 54 (11): 36–37, 40–41.	Ondaatje, Michael (2007). Divisadero. McClelland and Stewart.

=== Selected introductions ===
- Graham Greene, The Complete Stories
- Peter Matthiessen, The Snow Leopard
- Somerset Maugham, The Skeptical Romancer (editor/writer of introduction)
- R.K. Narayan, A Tiger for Malgudi, The Man-Eater of Malgudi, and The Vendor of Sweets
- Michael Ondaatje, The English Patient
- Hermann Hesse, Siddhartha (Peter Owen Publishers in London brought this out in August 2012)
- Arto Paasilinna, The Year of the Hare
- Frederic Prokosch, The Asiatics
- Donald Richie, The Inland Sea
- Nicolas Rothwell, Wings of the Kite-Hawk
- Huston Smith, Tales of Wonder
- Lawrence Weschler, A Wanderer in the Perfect City
- Natsume Soseki, The Gate (2012)

== Awards ==
- 2026 Membership in the American Academy of Arts and Letters
- 2024 Robert Kirsch Award

== Filmography ==
Year	Title	Role	Notes
2025	Marty Supreme	Ram Sethi	

== Further consideration ==
- Strayed, Cheryl (15 April 2020). "'Joyful Participation in a World of Sorrows'". The New York Times.
