= The Slant =

The Slant is the humor and satire magazine of Vanderbilt University. Founded in 2000, it is a member of Vanderbilt Student Communications.

== Pranks ==
The magazine's content and staff pranks have often led to controversy at Vanderbilt.

On March 11, 2003, The Slant ran a complete mock-up of The Vanderbilt Hustler entitled The Vanderbilt Huslter, with the headline "GEE DEAD," referring to then-Vanderbilt Chancellor Gordon Gee. The hoax received some attention from national media, including an appearance on the Drudge Report. Gee's office responded to the hoax by releasing a photo of him holding a copy of the fake issue (with Gee smiling). Despite Gee's good humor about the prank, the ensuing controversy led to the removal of The Slant's editor-in-chief from his post for inappropriately expropriating the Hustler's news racks in violation of Vanderbilt Student Communications regulations. Gee discussed the hoax in his 2003 commencement speech and Laura Bush mentioned the prank in her commencement speech in 2006.

In spring 2006, The Slant created a fake poster for the Rites of Spring Music Festival, Vanderbilt's annual outdoor music festival. The posters, hung around campus, falsely claimed that Ben Folds would be headlining the festival. The Hustler published the erroneous news as fact, later retracting the announcement in its next issue. Ironically, Ben Folds, who had previously been approached by Rites planners and was apparently unaware of the prank, soon thereafter agreed to headline the festival, prompting the Hustler to once again announce a Ben Folds-anchored lineup.

On November 16, 2007, the final day before Thanksgiving break, Slant staff members placed signs on the doors of dozens of classrooms across campus, informing students that their respective classes would instead be meeting in the Furman lecture hall for the day. As students from several different classes confusedly entered the same room, they were greeted with a breakfast of doughnuts, orange juice, and a screening of A Charlie Brown Christmas.

On February 5, 2009, The Slant ran a second The Vanderbilt Huslter, this time with a headline reading "Goodbye Greek life: Greek Life to be Kicked off Campus in Fall 2010". Although coming out on a Thursday, a day on which The Hustler does not usually print, and being put in The Slant newspaper racks, the paper still fooled many students. There were several clues in the 2009 version of The Huslter, including several obviously ridiculous stories, "Thes Lant" being announced as a possible opener for Vanderbilt's annual "Rites of Spring" music festival, the Slant editorial staff's presence on the editorial board, fake advertisements, and a straight out admission on page 4 in the opinion section's "Verdict": "As you may have guessed by now, the Slant published a DAMN good Hustler."

On April 9, 2025, The Slant held an event inside of Stevenson lecture hall, where they claimed they would host popular music artist Noah Kahan for a Q&A. The event was at full capacity, and instead of hosting Kahan for a Q&A, The Slant instead gave a lecture on why lying is wrong. This stunt was achieved by creating a fake student organization named the Vanderbilt Music Association. They successfully posed as a real club and held several meetings before announcing that they would "host" Kahan as a guest. The Slant even went as far as to put up their typical parody posters for events, which stated that Genghis Khan would be the guest speaker. A number of students were so thoroughly hoodwinked that they waited outside Stevenson for four hours prior to the event.
