= Zulfi Bhutto of Pakistan =

1993 book by Stanley Wolpert

Zulfi Bhutto of Pakistan: His Life & Times
- Author: Stanley Wolpert
- Language: English
- Genre: Biography
- Publisher: Oxford University Press, USA
- Publication date: July 1, 1993
- Pages: 400
- ISBN: 0195076613

Zulfi Bhutto of Pakistan: His Life & Times is a book written about Zulfikar Ali Bhutto by Stanley Wolpert. Wolpert described his subject thus:

No individual in the history of Pakistan--indeed, few people in modern history--have achieved greater popular power or suffered so ignominious a death as Zulfikar Ali Bhutto. Bhutto's political rise and fall were so meteoric that his name became a legend in the land he once ruled.
