= Gyanendra Pandey (historian) =

Indian historian

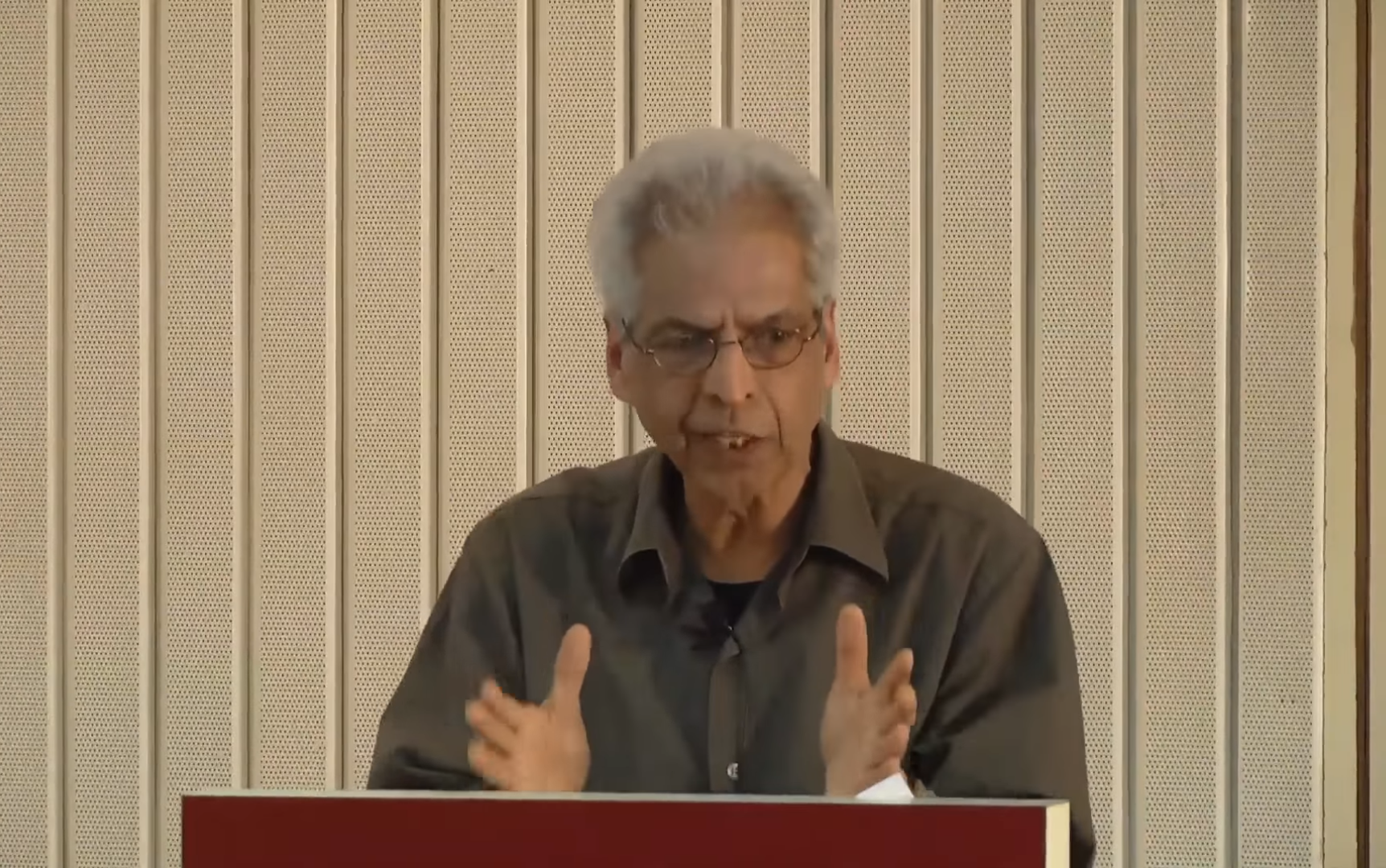
- Prof.Gyanendra pandey at University of Hyderabad
- Born: 1949 (age 76–77)
- Education: Sherwood College, Nainital; St. Stephen's College, Delhi; Nuffield College, Oxford; Lincoln College, Oxford; Wolfson College, Oxford

Gyanendra Pandey (born 1949) is a historian and a founding member of the Subaltern Studies project.

== Early life and career ==
Pandey did his schooling in Sherwood College, Nainital, and completed his B.A. (Hons.) in history at St. Stephen's College, Delhi, ranking first in the first class. He completed his D.Phil. in South Asian history under the supervision of Tapan Raychaudhuri as a Rhodes Scholar at Nuffield College, Oxford. He was a research fellow at Lincoln College, Oxford, and later at Wolfson College, Oxford, from 1974 to 1978.

He was a lecturer in history at the University of Leeds and then at the University of Hyderabad, which were followed by a fellowship at the Centre for Studies in Social Sciences in Kolkata. In 1985 he became a professor at the University of Allahabad, moving to a similar position at the University of Delhi from 1986 to 1998. He was a professor of anthropology and history and chair of the Department of Anthropology at Johns Hopkins University. Presently, he is an Arts and Sciences Distinguished Professor at Emory University, Atlanta, Georgia. In the Spring of 2021, he was a Fellow at the Swedish Collegium for Advanced Study in Uppsala, Sweden.

== Academic ==
Pandey has written widely on the subjects of South Asian and African-American history, on colonial and post-colonial themes, and on matters relating to subaltern studies.

He started a course at Emory University, US, combining Dalit history with that of African Americans. He is known for his proposition that "all racism is upper caste racism." He states.

"Upper caste, because ruling and dominant groups and classes across the globe believe it is their inherited right to rule and to live in special comfort and prosperity. Racism, because that is a way of keeping subordinated and marginalized groups – sometimes called minorities – "in their place;" and because the assumption of the right to rule, property and 'culture' leads to the segregation and subordination of those without privileged access to these, and to their denigration, castigation and even expulsion at times when they are seen as challenging the existing order of caste and race, Black and White."

== Select publications ==
Books

- Pandey, Gyanendra (1992). The Construction of Communalism in Colonial North India. Oxford University Press. ISBN 978-0-19-563010-7.. Reissued in 2006, ISBN 978-0-19-568364-6; and in 2012, ISBN 978-0-19-807730-5
- Pandey, Gyanendra (editor) (1993). Hindus and others: the question of identity in India today. Viking. ISBN 978-0-670-85485-1.
- Pandey, Gyanendra (2001). Remembering Partition: Violence, Nationalism and History in India. Cambridge University Press. ISBN 978-0-521-80759-3.
- Pandey, Gyanendra (2005). Routine Violence: Nations, Fragments, Histories. Stanford University Press. ISBN 978-0-8047-5263-3.
- Pandey, Gyanendra (2013). A History of Prejudice: Race, Caste, and Difference in India and the United States. ISBN 978-1107029002.
- Pandey, Gyanendra (2025). Men at Home: Imagining Liberation in Colonial and Postcolonial India. Duke University Press. ISBN 978-1-4780-2815-4.

Articles

- Pandey, Gyanendra (1983). "Rallying Around the Cow: The Sectarian Strifes in Bhojpuri Region', Subaltern Studies, II. 60-129.
- Pandey, Gyanandra (1988). "Congress and the Nation, 1917-1947". In Sisson, Richard; Wolpert, Stanley (eds.). Congress and Indian Nationalism: The Pre-Independence Phase. University of California Press. pp. 121–134. ISBN 978-0-520-06041-8.
- Pandey, Gyanendra (1991). 'In Defence of the Fragment: Writing About Hindu-Muslim Riots in India', Economic & Political Weekly, Annual Number, March, repr. in The Hunger of the Republic: Our Present in Retrospect, from the series India Since the 90s.
- Pandey, G. (1994) ‘Modes of history writing: New Hindu history of Ayodhya’, Economic and Political Weekly, 29(25): 1523-28.
- Pandey, Gyanendra (1999). "Can a Muslim Be an Indian?" Comparative Studies in Society and History, vol. 41, no. 4, pp. 608–629.
