= Eleanor Zelliot =

American historian and author (1926–2016)

- Born: October 7, 1926
- Died: June 5, 2016 (aged 89)
- Occupations: historian; professor; author
- Known for: Specialization in the History of India, Southeast Asia, Vietnam, and the Ambedkar Movement

Eleanor Zelliot (October 7, 1926 – June 5, 2016) was an American writer, professor of Carleton College and specialist on the India, Southeast Asia, Vietnam, women of Asia, Untouchables, and social movements.

Zelliot wrote over eighty articles and edited three books on the movement among Untouchables in India led by B. R. Ambedkar, on saint-poets of the medieval period, and on the Ambedkar-inspired Buddhist movement. She was one of the most prominent writers on Dalits of India. Eleanor Zelliot was an Ambedkarite thinker, and she has done scholarly writing on the Ambedkarite movement in India.

She completed her doctoral studies at the University of Pennsylvania in 1969, becoming the first scholar to complete a doctoral thesis on Dr. B.R. Ambedkar, a key figure in the Untouchable Movement in India. Zelliot's meticulous scholarship extended to the study of Bhakti saints, women saint-poets, untouchable saints, and Marathi Dalit literature. Her significant contributions include the translation of Marathi Dalit poetry in collaboration with writers like Mulk Raj Anand. Zelliot's translations, such as Keshav Meshram's "One Day I Cursed That Mother-Fucker God" and Namdeo Dhasal’s powerful poems, provided a poignant insight into Dalit perspectives.

Zelliot died at the age of 89 on June 5, 2016, in Minnesota.

== Bibliography ==
- Sisson, Richard; Wolpert, Stanley (January 1, 1988). "Congress and the Untouchables, 1917–1950". Congress and Indian Nationalism: The Pre-Independence Phase. University of California Press. pp. 182–198. ISBN 978-0-520-06041-8.
- Ambedkar's World: The Making of Babasaheb and the Dalit Movement
- From Untouchable to Dalit: Essays on the Ambedkar Movement, Manohar Publishers, 1992. ISBN 818542537X

=== Books ===
- The Experience of Hinduism
- From Untouchable to Dalit: Essays on the Ambedkar Movement
- Untouchable Saints: An Indian Phenomenon
- Ambedkar's World: The Making of Babasaheb and the Dalit Movement

=== Articles and Book Chapters ===
- "Buddhism and Politics in Maharashtra" in South Asian Politics and Religion, 1966.
- "Background of the Mahar Buddhist Conversion" in Studies on Asia, 1966.
- "The Revival of Buddhism in India" in Asia, 1968.
- "Gujarat" in Encyclopedia Americana, International Edition, 1975.
- "Learning the Use of Political Means — The Mahars of Maharashtra" in Caste in Indian Politics, 1970.
- "The Nineteenth Century Background of Mahar and Non-Brahman Movements in Maharashtra" in The Indian Economic and Social History Review, 1970.
- "Literary Images of the Indian City" in Urban India – Society, Space and Image, 1971.
- "Gandhi and Ambedkar — A Study in Leadership" in The Untouchables in Contemporary India, 1972.
- "Dr. Ambedkar and the Mahars" in Illustrated Weekly, 1972.
- "The Medieval Bhakti movement in History — An Essay on the Literature in English" in Hinduism – New Essays in the History of Religions, 1976.
- "Dalit Sahitya — The Historical Background" in Vagartha, 1976.
- "The Psychological Dimension of the Buddhist Movement in India" in Religion in South Asia: Religious Conversion and Revival Movements in Medieval and Modern Times, 1977.
- "The Leadership of Babasaheb Ambedkar" in Leadership in South Asia, 1977.
- "The American Experience of Dr. B.R. Ambedkar" in Dr. Ambedkar: Pioneer of Human Rights, 1977.
- "Dalit — New Cultural Context of an Old Marathi Word" in Language and Civilization Change in South Asia, 1978.
- "Introduction to Dalit Poems" with Gail Omvedt in Bulletin of Concerned Asian Scholars, 1978.
- "Religion and Legitimization in the Mahar Movement" in Religion and Legitimization in South Asia, 1978.
- "The Indian Rediscovery of Buddhism, 1855–1956" in Studies in Pali and Buddhism, 1978.
- "Journals of Indian History for the scholar, the student and the limited library" in South Asia Library Notes and Queries, 1978.
- "Dalit Poetry" — a page of translations, with others, from the Marathi in Illustrated Weekly, 1979.
- "Tradition and Innovation in the Contemporary Buddhist Movement in India" with Joanna Macy in Studies in the History of Buddhism, 1980.
- "British Nostalgia: The Long Look Back at Empire" in South Asia Library Notes and Queries, 1980.
- "Chokhamela and Eknath: Two Bhakti Modes of Legitimacy for Modern Change" in Images of Man: Religion and Historical Process in South Asia, 1982.
- "An Historical View of the Maharashtrian Intellectual and Social Change" in South Asian Intellectuals and Social Change: A Study of the Role of Vernacular-Speaking Intellectuals, 1982.
- A Marathi Sampler: Varied Voices in Contemporary Marathi Short Stories and poetry, 1982.
- "A Medieval Encounter between Hindu and Muslim: Eknath’s Drama-poem Hindu-turk samvad" in Images of Man: Religion and Historical Process in South Asia, 1982.
- "Gupta History and Literature: A Bibliographic Essay" with Ann Whitfield in Essays on Gupta Culture, 1983.
- "The World of Gundam Raul" in The Deeds of God in Rddhipur, 1984.
- "Buddhist Sects in Contemporary India: Identity and Organization" in Identity and Division in Cults and Sects in South Asia, 1984.
- Translation with Jayant Karve of Ghashiram Kotwal (Marathi) by Vijay Tendulkar, 1984.
- "Congress and the Untouchables" in Congress and Indian Nationalism, 1988.
- "Dalit: New Perspectives on India's Untouchables

== See also ==
- Gail Omvedt
