= Jinnah of Pakistan =

Biographical work of Muhammad Ali Jinnah by Stanley Wolpert

- Author: Stanley Wolpert
- Language: English
- Subject: Biography of Muhammad Ali Jinnah
- Genre: Biography, History
- Publication date: 1984
- ISBN: 0-19-503412-0

Jinnah of Pakistan is a biography of Muhammad Ali Jinnah, the founder and first governor-general of Pakistan, by Stanley Wolpert.

Wolpert described his subject as:

Few individuals significantly alter the course of history. Fewer still modify the map of the world. Hardly anyone can be credited with creating a nation-state. Muhammad Ali Jinnah did all three.
