= Connie Martinson =

American television personality (1932–2023)

- Born: April 11, 1932; Boston, Massachusetts, U.S.
- Died: March 9, 2023 (aged 90); Beverly Hills, California, U.S.
- Occupations: Journalist; producer
- Spouse: Leslie H. Martinson

Constance Frye Martinson (April 11, 1932 – March 9, 2023) was an American writer and television personality. From its 1979 debut, she hosted the syndicated television show Connie Martinson Talks Books, which aired on public television. A member of the National Book Critics Circle and PEN (Print & Electronic Network), she wrote a column for the weekly newspaper Beverly Hills Courier.

== Education ==
Constance Frye graduated in 1953 from Wellesley College in Massachusetts with a bachelor of arts degree and was awarded the Davenport Prize for speech and literature.

== Career ==
Martinson worked as an editor for Writer magazine in Boston before moving to Los Angeles with her husband, film and television director Leslie Martinson. Prior to parlaying her love of literature into a self-financed half-hour television series on books, she was involved in public relations for the Coro Foundation and taught at the University of California, Los Angeles and the University of Judaism.

The Connie Martinson Talks Books Collection, now donated to Claremont Graduate University, consists of nearly 3,000 television interviews (L.A. CityView Channel 35, Government-access television cable TV and PBS in New York City) with authors of fiction and nonfiction taped over the last 30 years. Included in the collection are interviews with Maya Angelou, Ray Bradbury, Al Gore, Rosa Parks, Gore Vidal, Studs Terkel, and Joyce Carol Oates. One of her most famous interviews took place in 1995 when she interviewed a then little-known author and future President of the United States named Barack Obama about his first book, Dreams From My Father. Interviews with a diverse group of best-selling authors include Matthew Pearl, Cathy Scott, Stanley Wolpert, Ved Mehta, Rod McKuen, Roger Cohen, and Vincent Bugliosi.

== Personal life and death ==
Connie Martinson was married to American film director Leslie H. Martinson. They resided in Beverly Hills, California.

Martinson died at her home in Beverly Hills on March 9, 2023, at the age of 90.
