= Rebekah Gee =

Physician and public health policy expert

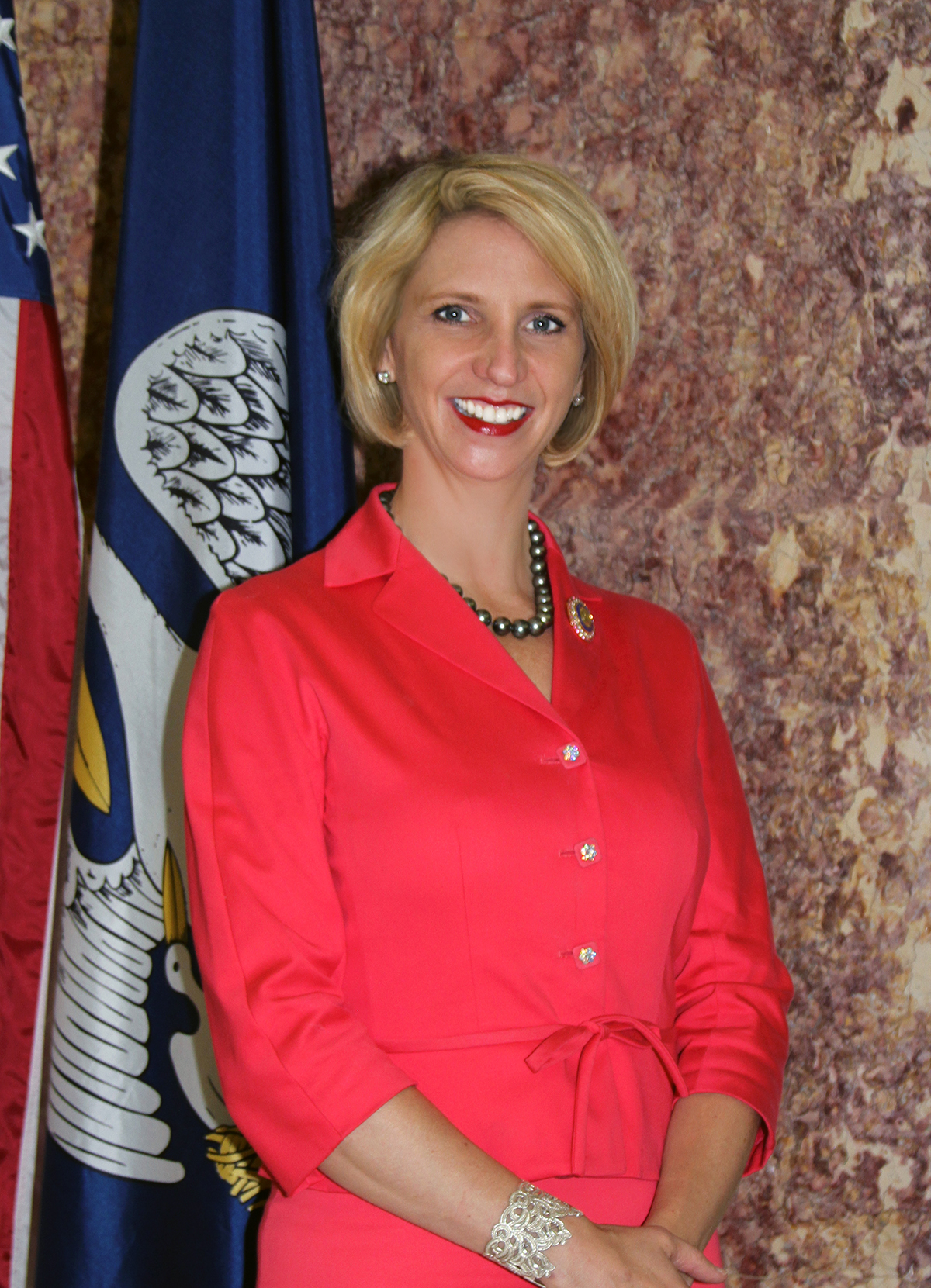
- Gee in 2016

Secretary of the Louisiana Department of Health
- In office January 11, 2016 – January 31, 2020
- Governor: John Bel Edwards
- Preceded by: Kathy Kliebert
- Succeeded by: Courtney Phillips

Personal details
- Born: Rebekah Elizabeth Gee; December 4, 1975 (age 50) Bountiful, Utah, U.S.
- Party: Democratic
- Spouse(s): Allan Moore (m. 2006; died 2008) David Patrón (m. 2010)
- Children: 5
- Relatives: E. Gordon Gee (father)
- Education: Columbia University (BA, MPH); Cornell University (MD); University of Pennsylvania (MS)

Rebekah Elizabeth Gee (born December 4, 1975) is an American physician and public health policy expert who is Founder and CEO of Nest Health and served as the secretary of the Louisiana Department of Health from 2016 to 2020. As Secretary, Gee led the expansion of Medicaid.

== Early life and education ==
Gee was born in Bountiful, Utah, she is the daughter of Elizabeth (née Dutson) and E. Gordon Gee, an academic administrator. Gee is the parent of five children, including identical twins; she lives in New Orleans.

Gee attended Columbia College, graduating with a Bachelor of Arts in American History in 1997. She then received her Master of Public Health from the Mailman School of Public Health at Columbia University in 1998, focused in Health Policy and Management. Gee went on to earn her medical degree from the Weill Medical College of Cornell University in 2002, completing her residency in obstetrics and gynecology through Harvard Medical School's Brigham and Women's Hospital and Massachusetts General Hospital in 2006. Gee was a Robert Wood Johnson Clinical Scholar at the University of Pennsylvania and in 2009, Gee obtained her Master of Science in Health Policy Research from the Perelman School of Medicine at the University of Pennsylvania. Gee is board certified in Obstetrics and Gynecology.

== Career ==
Gee is an obstetrician/gynecologist and founder and CEO of Nest Health. Nest Health has been recognized as one of ten most promising hybrid health care companies and one of 150 most promising digital healthcare companies in the world by CB insights. From 2020 to 2022, Gee was CEO of Health Care Services for Louisiana State University.

From 2016 to 2020, she was Secretary of the Louisiana Department of Health, where she led the expansion of Medicaid and helped develop an innovative subscription drug payment model that allowed the state to provide unlimited access to highly active anti-hepatitis C medication (sofosbuvir/velpatasvir) for its HCV-infected Medicaid and incarcerated populations.
