= Robert Kurt Woetzel =

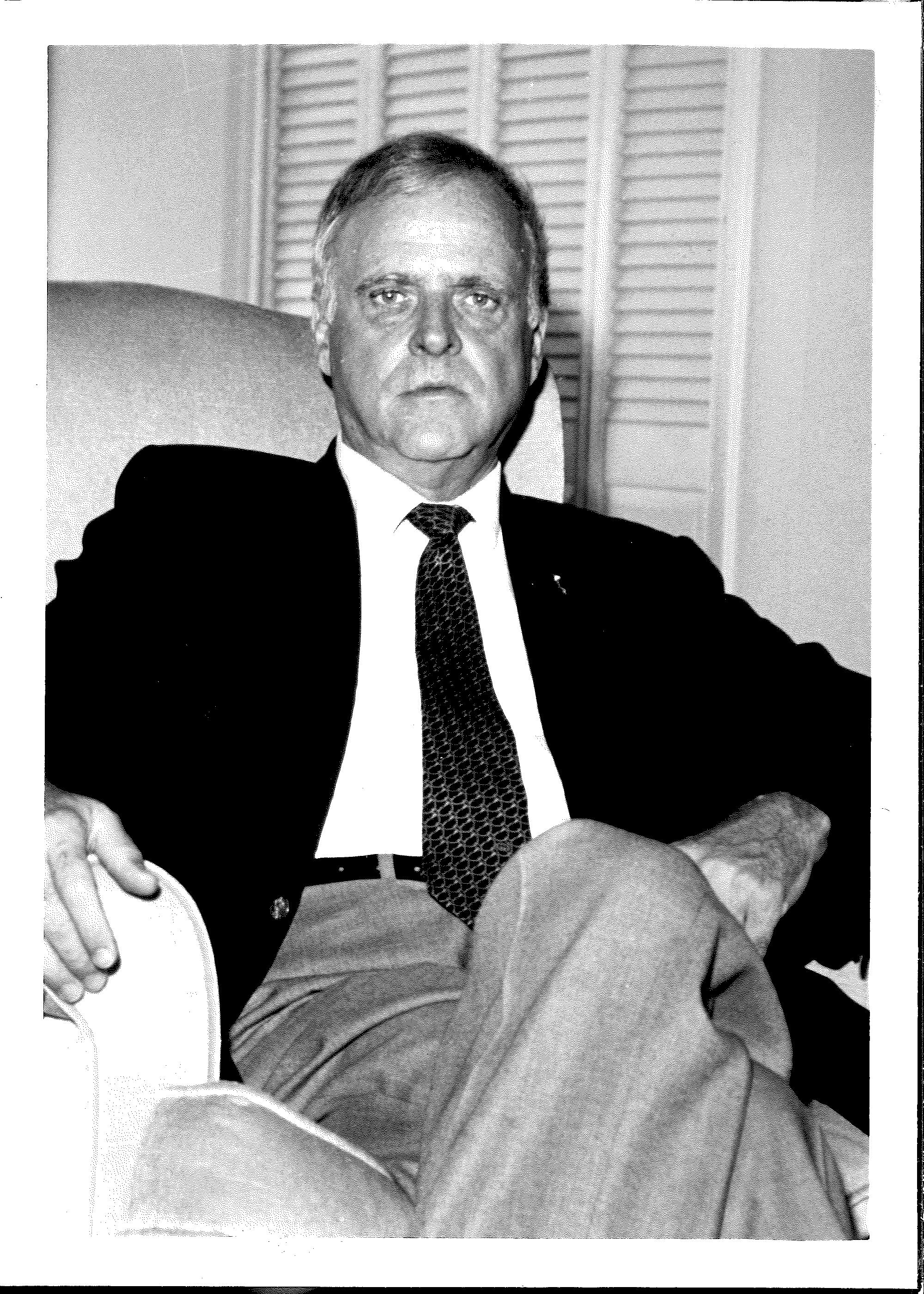
Robert Kurt Woetzel

Robert Kurt Woetzel (December 5, 1930 – September 6, 1991), professor of international law, was for many years a leading proponent for the establishment of the International Criminal Court.

== Early life and education ==
Woetzel’s parents were German, his mother Jewish. The family left Germany because of its growing anti-Semitism, but before Hitler was in power. Woetzel was born in Shanghai, where his father was a chemical engineer. Following the conclusion of the Second World War, Woetzel moved to New York City. After receiving an A. B. degree from Columbia University (1952), Woetzel served in the American army (1954–1956), earned a Ph. D. at Oxford (1955) and a law degree at Bonn University (1959). He also served as a legislative assistant for the U.S. House of Representatives in 1956, and was a personal aid to Adlai Stevenson during the 1956 Democratic Convention, where Stevenson became the Party’s nominee for President. At Oxford, he became close friends with A. N. R. Robinson, who in 1989, as Prime Minister of Trinidad and Tobago, reintroduced a proposal for an International Criminal Court to the United Nations General Assembly. An earlier UN effort to create an international criminal court in the early 1950s had failed due to the Cold War.

Woetzel’s doctoral dissertation, on the legality of the Nuremberg trials, was published as The Nuremberg Trials in International Law. His main purpose in The Nuremberg Trials was to defend the basis of the Nuremberg trials in international law, opposing legal scholars who had argued that the trials were ex post facto and illegal. However, he also expressed the hope that the Nuremberg trials would eventually lead to the establishment of an international criminal court.

== Professional career ==
From 1959 through 1964, Woetzel taught international law at Fordham University and New York University. In the mid-1960s, he was a senior fellow of the Center for the Study of Democratic Institutions in Santa Barbara, California. From 1966 until 1982, he taught at Boston College. He then moved to Los Angeles, where his elderly parents resided, and taught as an adjunct professor at Pepperdine University, the University of Southern California, the University of California, Los Angeles, Occidental College, and the University of California, Santa Barbara.

== Work on the International Criminal Court ==
In 1965, Woetzel founded the International Criminal Law Commission and served as its Secretary-General; the Commission conducted legal seminars on needed advances in international law. In 1970, he co-edited Toward a Feasible International Criminal Court, to “clarify some main issues concerning the establishment of an international criminal court.” The following year, he created the Foundation for the Establishment of an International Criminal Court; until 1990, the Foundation held seminars around the world with experts in international law, directed toward establishing the Court. To spur the UN to reconsider the Court, a Foundation team of legal experts prepared drafts for both an international code of crimes and a Court treaty.

In 1989, Woetzel assisted A. N. R. Robinson and Benjamin Ferencz in drafting the proposal that reintroduced the idea of an International Criminal Court to the General Assembly. In one of his last activities, he helped write A Magna Carta for the Nuclear Age, published shortly after his death. Article 2 of this Magna Carta called again for the UN to establish “An International Criminal Court, composed of distinguished jurists. . .”4

== Other Writings ==
Robert Woetzel's other books include The Problem of Germany: A Post-war Analysis (1952), The International Control of Outer Space (1961), and The Philosophy of Freedom (1966).

== Death and Survivors ==
Woetzel died in 1991 of a heart attack at his home in Santa Barbara, not surviving to see the birth of the International Criminal Court that he had advocated for many years. Woetzel is survived by two sons. Jonathan is an economist living in Shanghai. Damian Woetzel was a principal dancer for the New York City Ballet until his retirement in 2008; in 2018, he became president of the Juilliard School.

== Honors ==
Woetzel received many honors for his work, including the Einstein Prize for American Diplomacy. In 2002, with the International Criminal Court established, the Nuclear Age Peace Foundation awarded its Distinguished Peace Leadership Award jointly to Woetzel (posthumously) and A. N. R. Robinson.

== Selected bibliography ==
Stone, J. and Woetzel, Robert K. (Eds.), Toward a Feasible International Criminal Court (Geneva: World Peace Through Law Center, 1970).

Robert K. Woetzel, The Nuremberg Trials in International Law (London: Stevens & Sons, 1960).

Robert K. Woetzel. The Philosophy of Freedom (Dobbs Ferry, N.Y. : Oceana Publications, 1966).
