= Spring Weekend =

Music festival at Brown University

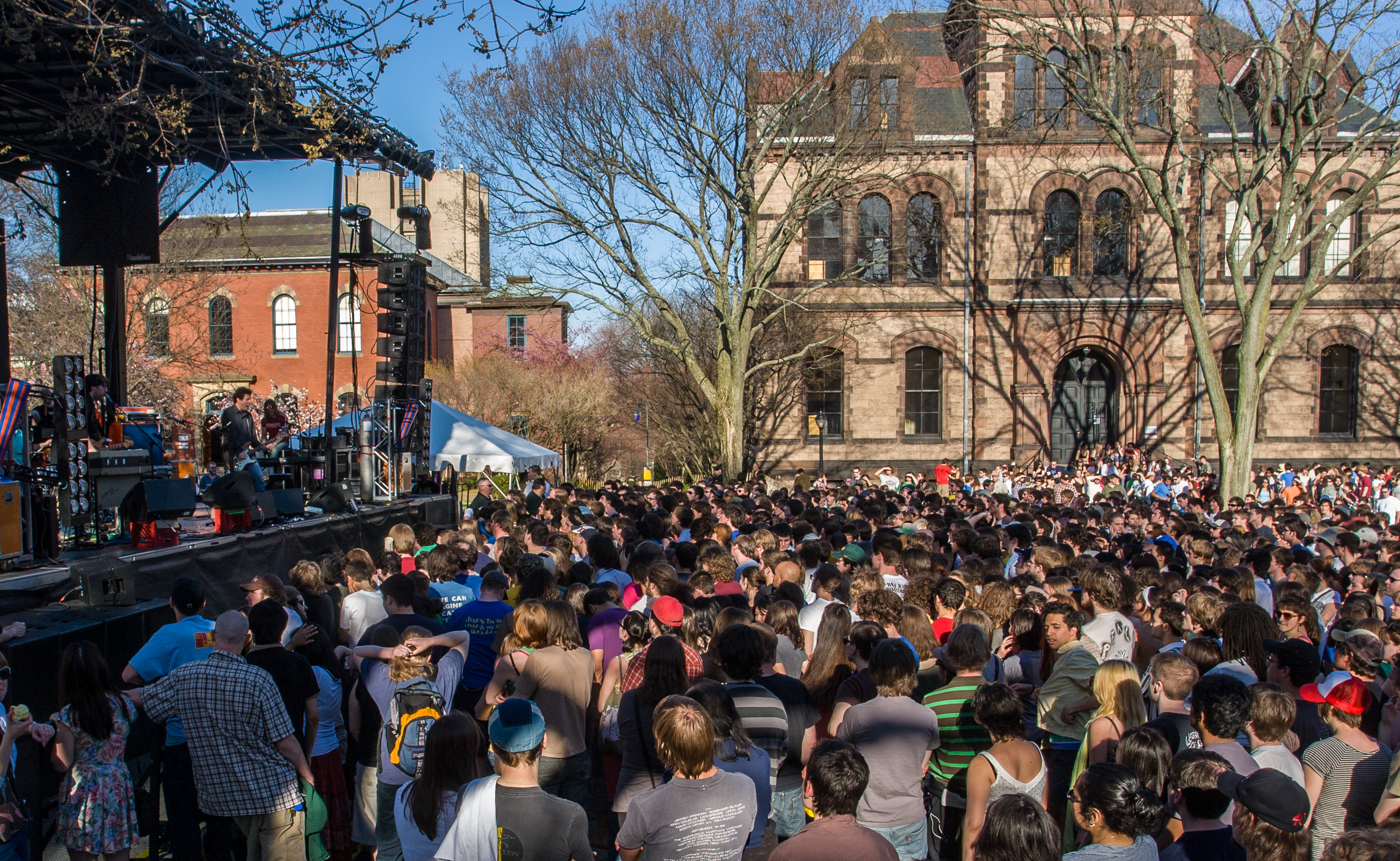
- Yo La Tengo in 2007
- Dates: Weekend in April or May (historically)
- Locations: Brown University, Providence, RI
- Years active: 1950–2019, 2021–present
- Organizer: Brown Concert Agency
- Website: https://brownconcertagency.com

Spring Weekend is a student-organized music festival hosted annually in April at Brown University in Providence, Rhode Island. Spring Weekend was officially founded in 1950, though is rooted in a late 19th-century spring festival tradition known as Junior Promenade. Celebrity artists were first brought to campus starting in the 1960s.

The festival is organized by the Brown Concert Agency, a student group overseen by Brown's Student Activities Office and funded by the university's Undergraduate Finance Board. Historical Spring Weekend acts include Bob Dylan (1964 and 1997), Ella Fitzgerald (1965), Ray Charles (1967), James Brown (1968), Bruce Springsteen (1974), U2 (1983), R.E.M. (1985), and Sonic Youth (1998). More recent headliners include Snoop Dogg (2010), Childish Gambino (2012), Kendrick Lamar (2013), Young Thug (2017), Daniel Caesar (2019), and Mitski (2019). Noted non-musical Spring Weekend guests include Martin Luther King Jr. (1967) and Allen Ginsberg (1968).

In 2020, the festival was cancelled for the first time since 1950 in response to the COVID-19 pandemic.

== History ==
=== Junior Promenade ===
Spring Weekend is rooted in a late 19th-century spring tradition at Brown known as Junior Promenade. In 1897, the university's Junior Class Committee met to discuss the possibility of a spring celebration; while originally dismissed, the idea resurfaced the following year and gained approval; the inaugural Junior Promenade was held in 1898. In 1901, the tradition was restructured as Junior Week, adopting a longer and more diverse program of events and student performances.

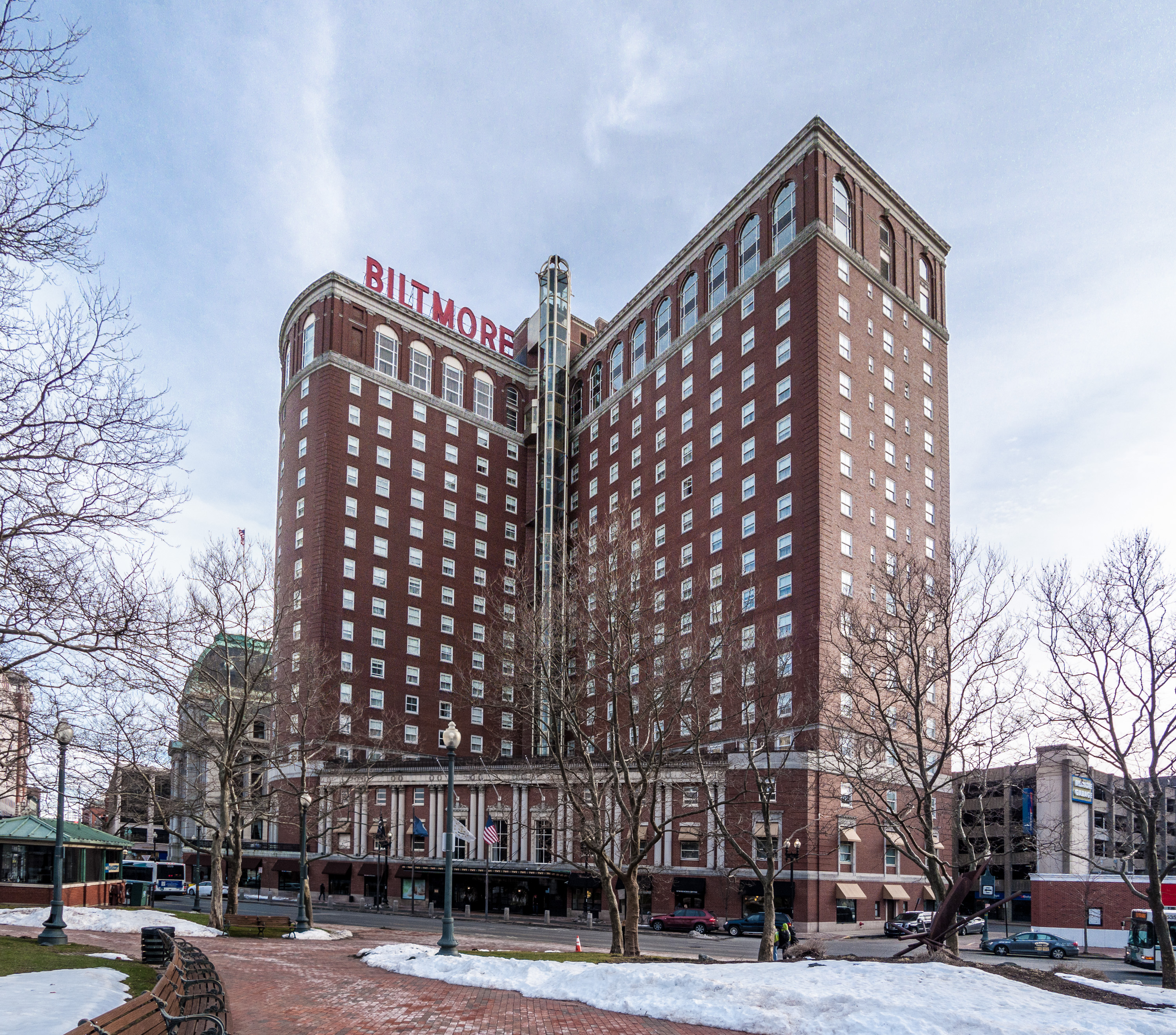
250 couples attended the 1935 Junior Promenade, which was hosted at the Providence Biltmore.

=== Early iterations ===
Junior Week and Promenade lapsed during World War II and in 1948 were replaced with All-Campus Weekend. Spring Weekend, in turn, succeeded All-Campus Weekend in 1950. The inaugural Spring Weekend featured club events, student performances, athletic contests, a buffet, and dances held in Faunce House and fraternity houses. In the 1960s, concerts and shows featuring celebrity artists replaced student performances and dances. In 1960, students formed the Brown Concert Agency to plan and organize the event. Headliners of the festival in its early years included Bob Dylan (1964) and Ella Fitzgerald (1965). In 1967, the festival featured Peter, Paul and Mary, Ray Charles, and Jefferson Airplane; Martin Luther King Jr., in Providence on other business, preached at the Sunday morning Protestant service held in Sayles Hall.

The 1968 festival was larger than its predecessors and marked Spring Weekend's transition from a "drunken brawl" into a "classier affair." Ira Magaziner, an organizer of the event wrote of the festival "We had James Brown, Dionne Warwick, Procol Harum, the Yardbirds and Dizzy Gillespie; for the poetry crowd we had Allen Ginsberg and Lawrence Ferlinghett... To launch the event, we chartered a small airplane to fly over the college green and dump thousands of colored ping pong balls stamped with WELCOME SPRING WEEKEND."

1969 headliners included Janis Joplin, who, according to The Brown Daily Herald, "Hunching, jumping, lunging at the microphone, stamping, clawing the air, the Blue-Eyed Soul Sister electrified an audience she huskily called ‘groovy.’” Gordon Lightfoot, Smokey Robinson, Carlos Montoya and Herbie Mann also performed.

=== 1970–1999 ===
Noted Spring Weekend acts in the 1970s included Tina Turner (1972) and Bruce Springsteen (1974). Guests in the 1980s include U2 (1983), R.E.M. (1985), and Elvis Costello (1987). In 1984, following the passage of the National Minimum Drinking Age Act and Rhode Island's subsequent raising of the legal drinking age, the university brought off-duty state troopers to campus to perform optional breathalyzer tests. In 1991, Spring Weekend ended a longstanding practice of serving alcohol, apparently motivated by cost and potential liability issues. Artists featured in the 1990s include Tito Puente and Boogie Down Productions (1991), A Tribe Called Quest (1992), Indigo Girls (1995), Bob Dylan (1997), Sonic Youth (1998), Busta Rhymes, and Common (1999).

=== 2000–present ===
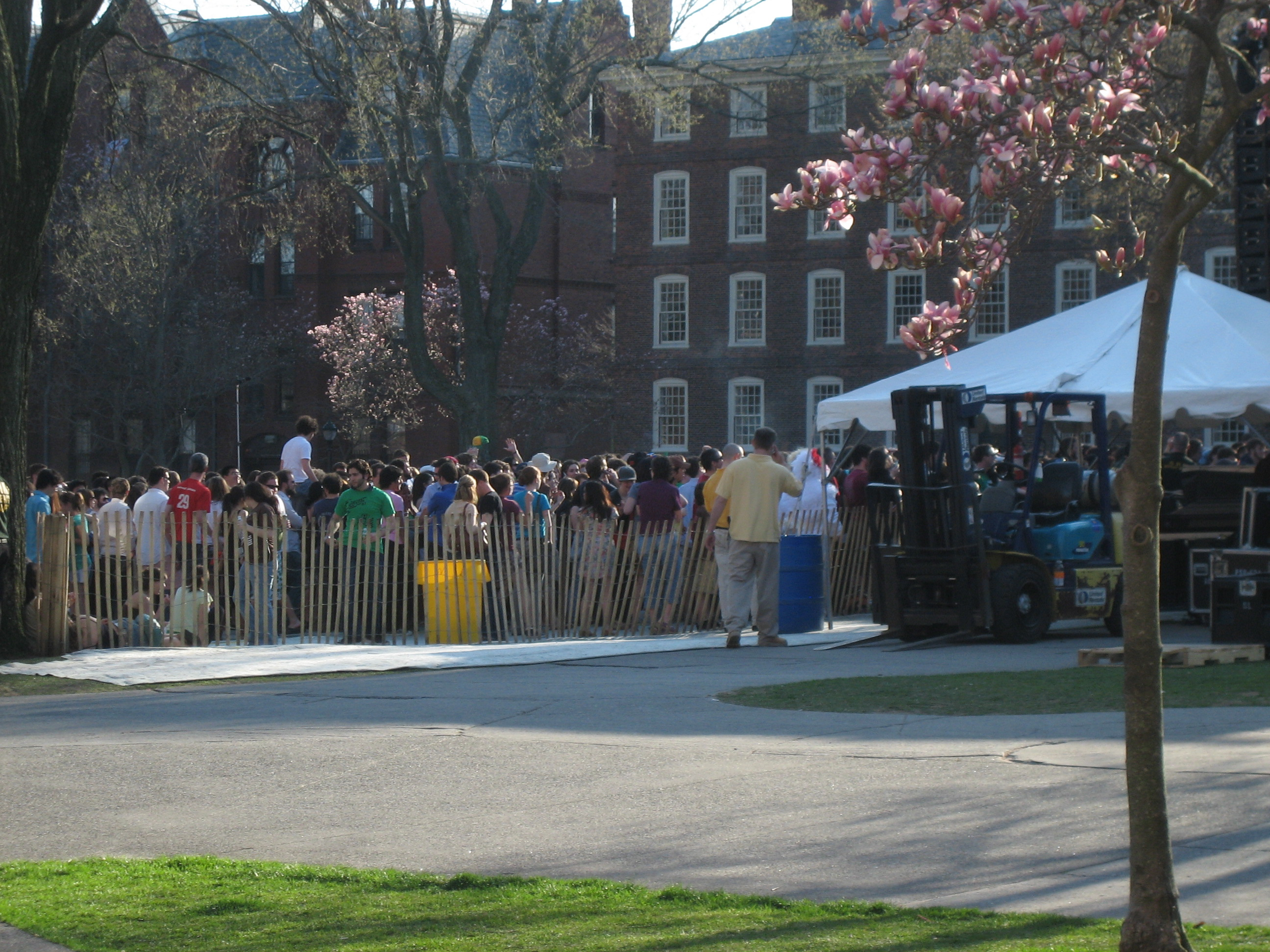
Spring Weekend 2007

Noted guests in the 2000s include Wyclef Jean (2000), Ben Folds (2005), M.I.A. (2008), Vampire Weekend (2008), and Nas (2009). Headliners in the 2010s included Snoop Dogg (2010), Childish Gambino (2012), Kendrick Lamar (2013), Chance the Rapper (2014), Modest Mouse (2015), Mac DeMarco (2016), Young Thug (2017), and Mitski (2019). In 2013, The Brown Daily Herald and other campus press outlets received an email from a user impersonating the Brown Concert Agency that included a fake lineup of artists including "The Sounds of Capitalism," Toro Y Moi, The Postal Service, and Grouper.

==== COVID-19 pandemic ====
In 2020, the festival was cancelled for the first time since 1950 in response to the COVID-19 pandemic. The Brown Concert Agency did not publicly announce which artists were scheduled to perform at the 2020 festival, although an unsubstantiated rumor purported the lineup to include Doja Cat. The 2021 festival featuring Phoebe Bridgers and KAYTRANADA was held online.

== Lineups ==
1970–1989
Year	Dates	Headliners
1970	April 24–26	Ray Charles; The Band; Jefferson Airplane; John Sebastian; John Mayall
1971	April 30–May 2	Gordon Lightfoot; Bonnie Raitt; Boz Scaggs; Laura Nyro
1972	April 28–30	Billy Preston; Blue Öyster Cult; Mahavishnu Orchestra; The Youngbloods; New Riders of the Purple Sage
1973	May 4–6	Todd Rundgren; Fanny; Livingston Taylor; Country Joe McDonald; Jonathan Edwards
1974	April 26–28	Bruce Springsteen; Phil Ochs
1975	April 25–27	Harry Chapin; John Mayall; Richie Havens
1976	April 30–May 20	Buddy Guy and Junior Wells; Roy Buchanan; Firefall; Gary Burton; JD Souther; The Holy Modal Rounders; Roomful of Blues
1977		Leo Kottke; Roomful of Blues; Pousette-Dart Band
1978	April 28–30	Bonnie Raitt; Dave Brubeck; Tower of Power; NRBQ
1979	April 27–29	Sun Ra; Atlanta Rhythm Section; John P. Hammond; Albert Collins; Pousette-Dart Band
1980		Jorma Kaukonen & Vital Parts; Robin Lane & the Chartbusters
1981	April 24-27	NRBQ; John Hall Band; John Acheson; Mary Chapin Carpenter
1982	April 30–May 2	Graham Parker; Toots and the Maytals; David Bromberg
1983	April 29–May 1	U2; NRBQ; The Roches
1984	April 27–29	Paul Young; Arlo Guthrie; Howard Jones
1985	April 26–28	R.E.M.; Afrika Bambaataa; Pablo Moses; The Neats
1986	April 18–20	Los Lobos; Trouble Funk
1987	April 24–26	Elvis Costello; Nick Lowe
1988	April 15–17	NRBQ; The Wailers Band
1989	April 28–30	Little Feat; Tom Tom Club; Toots and the Maytals

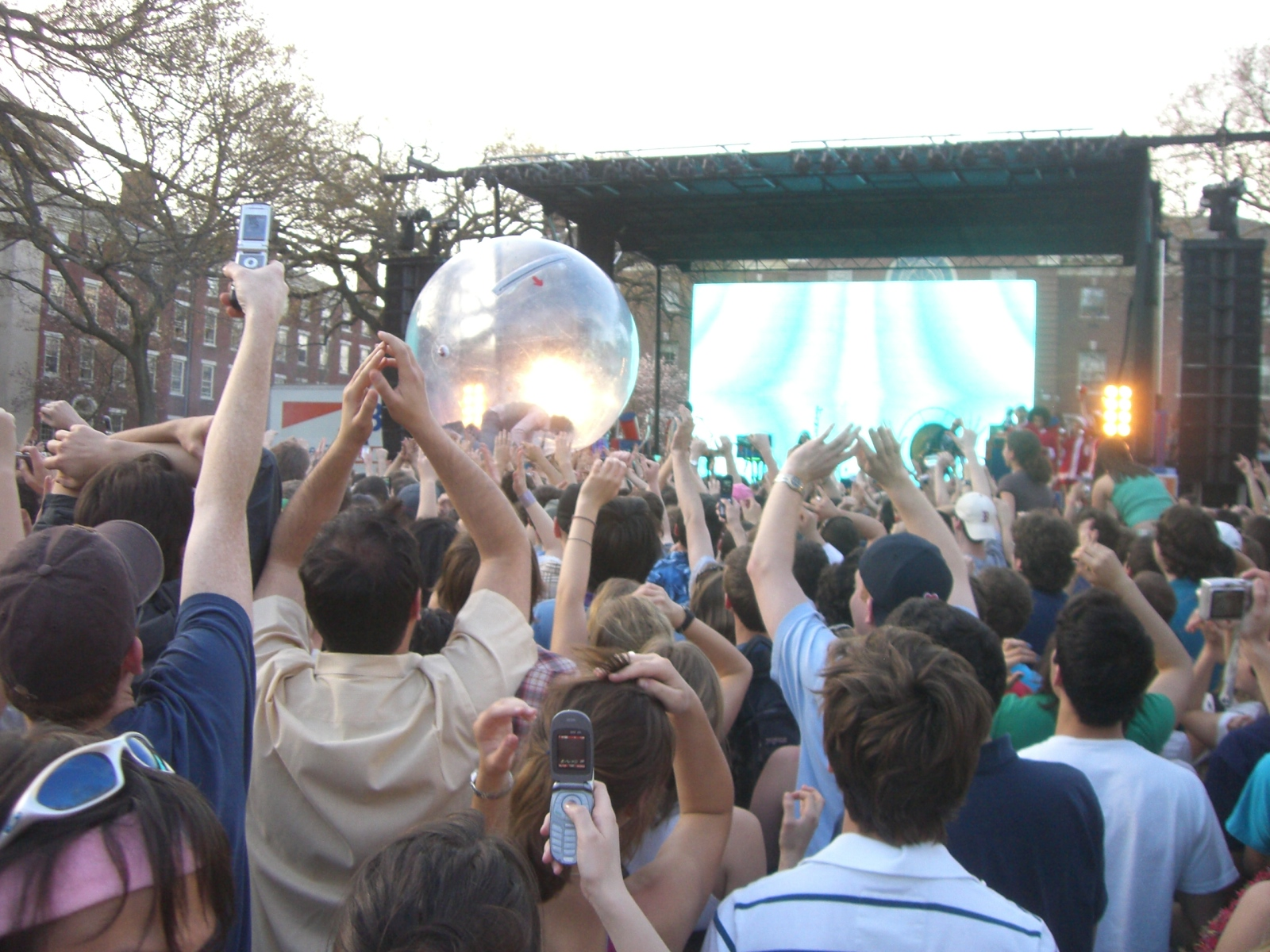
Flaming Lips playing at Spring Weekend 2007

1990–2009
Year	Dates	Headliners
1990	April 27–29	Ziggy Marley and the Melody Makers; 24-7 Spyz; Trouble Funk
1991	April 26–28	Tito Puente; Boogie Down Productions; Shinehead
1992	April 17–19	A Tribe Called Quest; De La Soul; Mary Chapin Carpenter
1993	April 9–11	10,000 Maniacs; Black Sheep
1994	April 22–24	Violent Femmes; Buddy Guy; Buffalo Tom
1995	April 20–23	Indigo Girls; Digable Planets; Morphine; Bim Skala Bim
1996	April 11–14	Coolio; Fugees; George Clinton and The P-Funk Allstars; Chucklehead
1997	April 17–20	Bob Dylan; Bo Diddley; The Toasters; The Slip
1998	April 16–19	Sonic Youth; KRS-One; Rakim; Grandmaster Flash; Yo La Tengo; Luna
1999	April 22–25	Busta Rhymes; Common; Black Star; Maseo; Wilco; Vic Chesnutt
2000	April 13–16	Wyclef Jean; Kelis; G. Love & Special Sauce
2001	April 19–22	They Might Be Giants; Violent Femmes; Jurassic 5
2002	April 19–21	The Roots; Rufus Wainwright; Saves the Day
2003	April 10–13	Lisa Loeb; The Wallflowers; The Donnas
2004	April 22–25	Sleater-Kinney; Jurassic 5; Reel Big Fish
2005	April 21–24	Ben Folds; Talib Kweli; The Shins
2006	April 20–23	Common; Wilco; OK Go
2007	April 19–22	The Roots; The Flaming Lips; Yo La Tengo; Mission of Burma
2008	April 10–13	M.I.A.; Vampire Weekend; Lupe Fiasco; Girl Talk
2009	April 17–19	Nas; Santigold; of Montreal

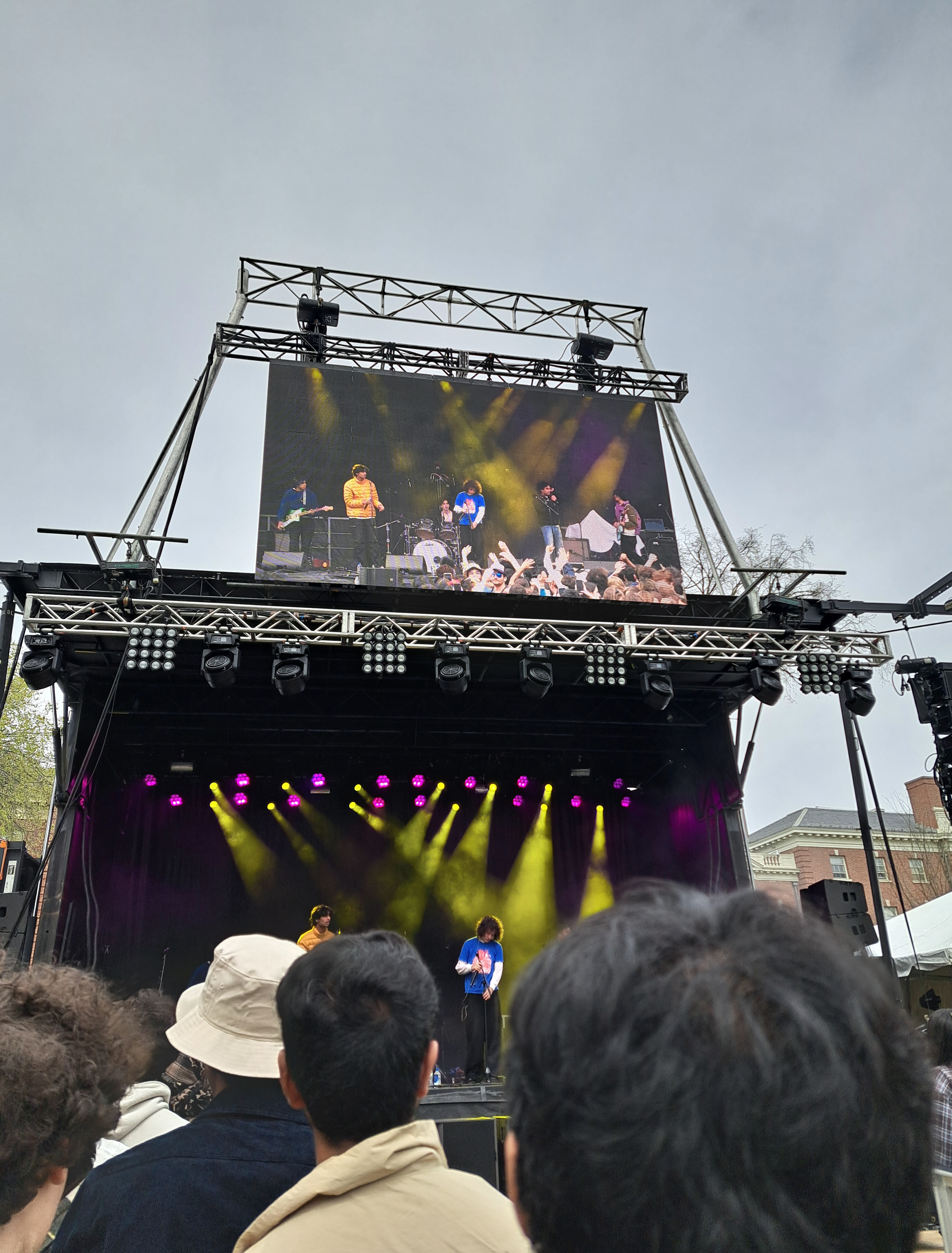
Weston Estate performing at Spring weekend 2024

2010–
Year	Dates	Headliners
2010	April 22–25	Snoop Dogg; Major Lazer; MGMT; The Black Keys
2011	April 15–17	Wyclef Jean; Nicolas Jaar; TV on the Radio
2012	April 20–22	Childish Gambino; Cam'ron; The Glitch Mob; The Walkmen
2013	April 18–21	Kendrick Lamar; A-Trak; Dirty Projectors; Big Freedia
2014	April 11–13	Chance the Rapper; Diplo; Lauryn Hill
2015	April 17–19	Waka Flocka Flame; Pusha T; Hudson Mohawke; Kelela; Modest Mouse; Yeasayer
2016	April 14–17	Mac DeMarco; Thundercat; Tinashe; Fetty Wap
2017	April 27–30	Young Thug; Erykah Badu; Empress Of; Princess Nokia
2018	April 26–29	Rico Nasty; Anderson .Paak & The Free Nationals; Rina Sawayama; DRAM; Nao
2019	April 26–28	Aminé; Daniel Caesar; Mitski
2020	Cancelled due to the COVID-19 pandemic	
2021 (Note: Held virtually due to the COVID-19 pandemic)	April 10	Phoebe Bridgers; KAYTRANADA
2022	April 29–30	Ari Lennox; Tems; Amaarae; Flo Milli; Smino; Maye
2023	April 29–30	Ethel Cain; 070 Shake; JID; Doechii; Remi Wolf; Alice Longyu Gao
2024	April 21	Yves Tumor; Jordan Ward; Elyanna; Weston Estate
2025	April 26	Offset; JT; Ravyn Lenae; Zack Fox
2026	April 25	Thee Sacred Souls; Magdalena Bay; BunnaB; Isabella Lovestory
