= Louisiana Department of Health =

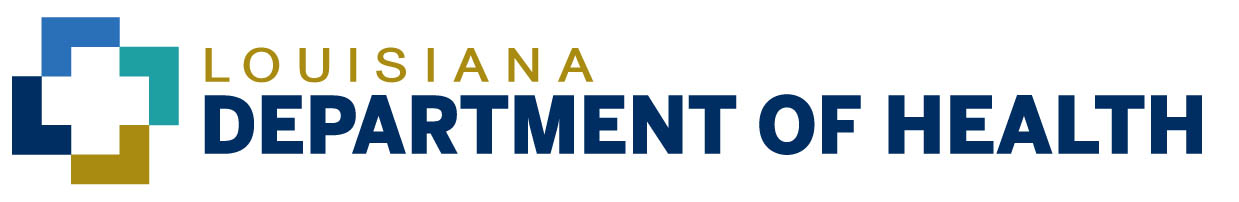

Agency overview
- Jurisdiction: Louisiana
- Headquarters: Baton Rouge, Louisiana
- Employees: 6,500+
- Annual budget: $21 billion USD (2024)
- Agency executives: Evelyn Griffin, Surgeon General; Drew Maranto, Interim Secretary
- Website: http://ldh.la.gov/

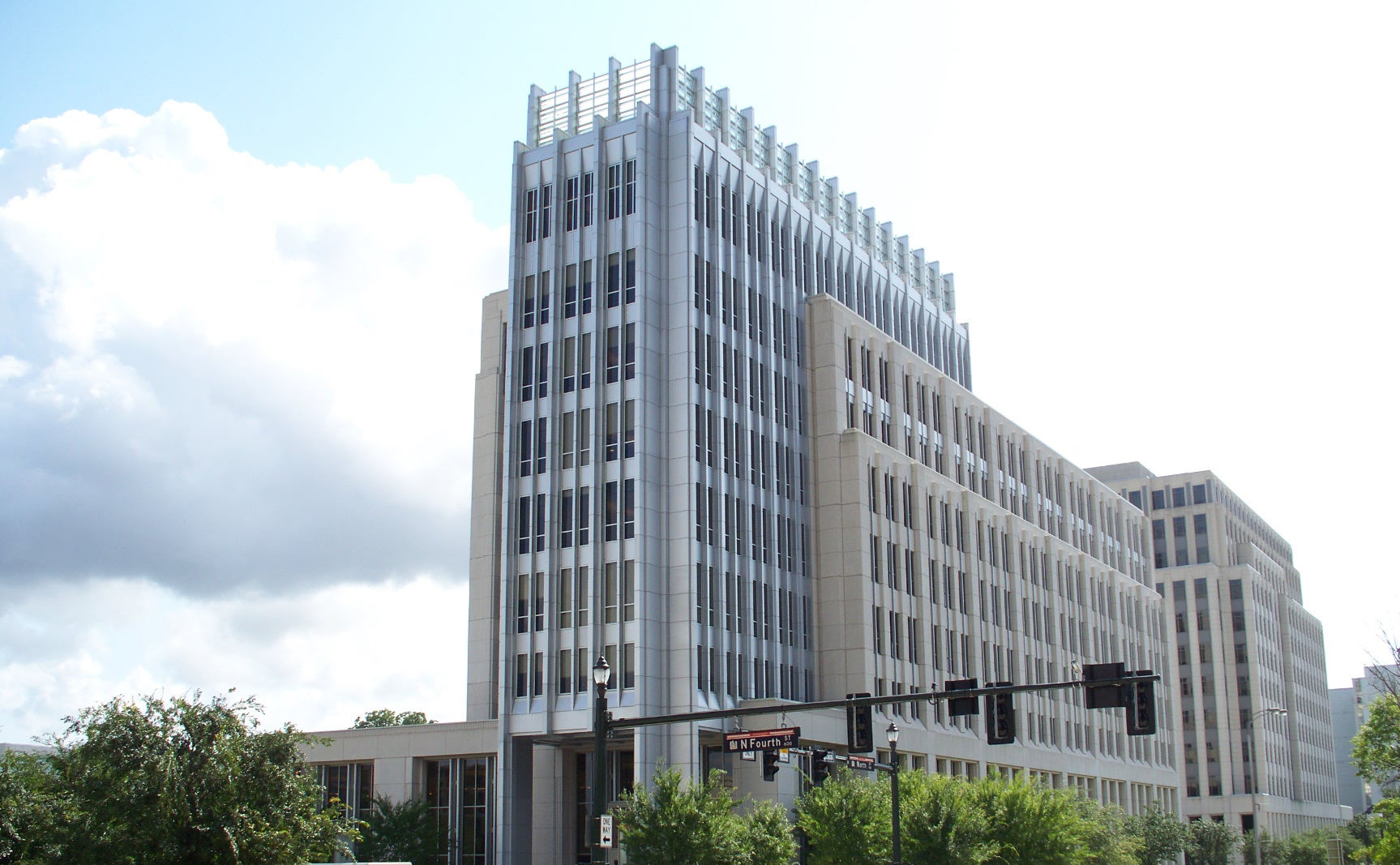
Headquarters of the Louisiana Department of Health

The Louisiana Department of Health (LDH) (French: Département de La Santé de Louisiane), formerly known as the Louisiana Department of Health and Hospitals (French: Département de La Santé et des Hôpitaux), is a state agency of Louisiana, headquartered in Baton Rouge. The department's mission is to protect and promote health and to ensure access to medical, preventive and rehabilitative services for all citizens of the state of Louisiana. It is Louisiana's largest state agency with a budget of $21 billion and over 6,500 personnel. The agency oversees the health of the population under its current secretary, Ralph L. Abraham, M.D..

== Leadership ==
Ralph L. Abraham, M.D. was appointed Secretary in December 2023 by then Governor-elect Jeff Landry. Dr. Abraham is a practicing family medicine physician in Richland Parish and a former three-term Congressman for Louisiana’s 5th Congressional District.

Dr. Pete Croughan serves as deputy secretary, having previously served LDH as chief of staff to former Secretary Dr. Rebekah Gee. The deputy secretary is the coordinator for LDH's Regional Coordinating Councils and oversees the coordination and implementation of the 1996 Health Insurance Portability and Accountability Act (HIPAA).

== Offices ==
LDH's agencies include:

- Office of Public Health
  - Monitors food and safe drinking water
  - Fights chronic and communicable disease
  - Ensures readiness for hurricanes, disasters and other threats
  - Manages, analyzes and disseminates public health data
  - Ensures access to vital records for births, deaths, fetal deaths and Orleans Parish marriage records
  - Offers preventive health services
- Office of Behavioral Health
  - Manages and delivers supports and services for citizens with mental illness and addictive disorders
  - Delivers direct care through hospitalization
  - Oversees behavioral health community-based treatment programs through the human services districts and authorities
- Office of Women's Health and Community Health
  - Created by Act 676 (SB 116) of the 2022 Regular Legislative Session, and signed by Governor John Bel Edwards on June 18, 2022
  - Focuses on health needs throughout a woman’s life, including chronic or acute conditions that significantly affect women, access to healthcare for women, and women’s health disparities
- Office for Citizens with Developmental Disabilities
  - Single point of entry into the developmental disabilities services system
  - Oversees public and private residential services and other services for people with developmental disabilities
- Office of Aging and Adult Services
  - Manages and delivers supports and services for senior citizens and people with adult-onset disabilities
  - Provides and enhances services for people in need of long-term care
- Medicaid
  - Provides medical benefits to low-income individuals and families
  - Expanded under Gov. John Bel Edwards in 2016 through the Patient Protection and Affordable Care Act
  - Medicaid expansion has provided nearly 480,000 previously uninsured residents with coverage, dropping the state's uninsured rate to 8.4% in 2017

LDH also includes the Bureau of Community Partnerships & Health Equity, which is responsible for operationalizing community engagement and health equity best practices and standards agency wide, and plays a role in the State of Louisiana's emergency preparedness network.

== Geographic Structure ==
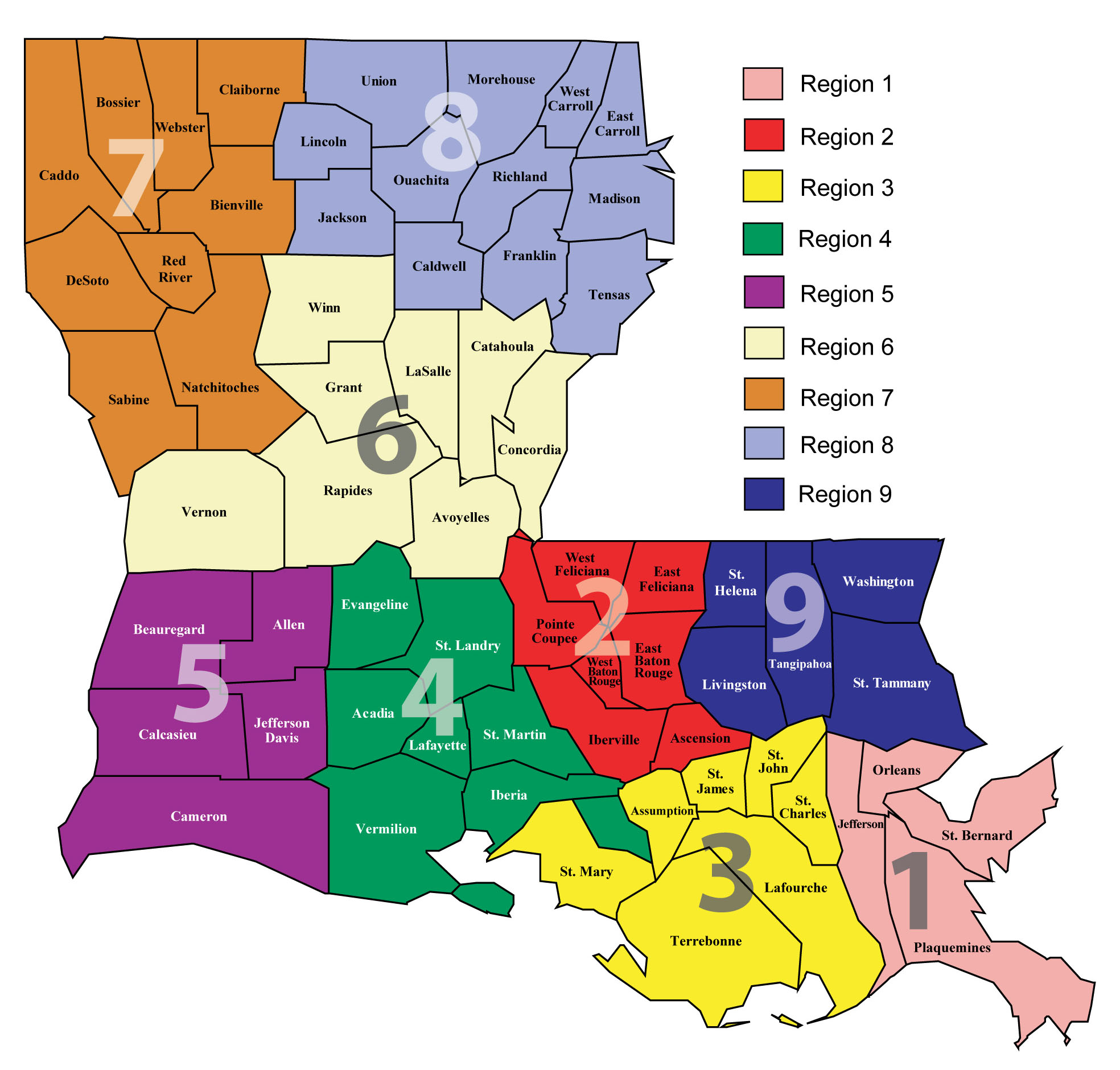
The nine regions of the Louisiana Department of Health

The Louisiana Department of Health provides public health services and oversight across Louisiana in nine regions.

| Region | Headquarters | Area (Parishes) |
|---|---|---|
| 1* | New Orleans | Jefferson, Orleans, Plaquemines, St. Bernard |
| 2 | Baton Rouge | Ascension, East Baton Rouge, East Feliciana, Iberville, Pointe Coupee, West Baton Rouge, West Feliciana |
| 3 | Houma | Assumption, Lafourche, St. Charles, St. James, St. John, St. Mary, Terrebonne |
| 4 | Lafayette | Acadia, Evangeline, Iberia, Lafayette, St. Landry, St. Martin, Vermilion |
| 5 | Lake Charles | Allen, Beauregard, Calcasieu, Cameron, Jefferson Davis |
| 6 | Alexandria | Avoyelles, Catahoula, Concordia, Grant, LaSalle, Rapides, Vernon, Winn |
| 7 | Shreveport | Bienville, Bossier, Caddo, Claiborne, DeSoto, Natchitoches, Red River, Sabine, Webster |
| 8 | Monroe | Caldwell, East Carroll, Franklin, Jackson, Lincoln, Madison, Morehouse, Ouachita, Richland, Tensas, Union, West Carroll |
| 9 | Hammond | Livingston, St. Helena, St. Tammany, Tangipahoa, Washington |
| 10 | Metairie | Jefferson |

== Controversies ==
In 2024, the department implemented a new policy barring the mass promotion of influenza, COVID-19, and Mpox vaccines, shifting away from a "one-size-fits-all" approach in favor of "an individual’s personal choice." Louisiana Surgeon General Ralph Abraham reaffirmed the decision in February 2025, announcing that in an effort to restore trust in the public health system, the department "will no longer promote mass vaccination."
