= Center for the Study of Democratic Institutions =

American think tank (1959–1987)

- Abbreviation: CSDI
- Formation: 1959
- Headquarters: Santa Barbara, California, United States
- Key people: Robert M. Hutchins; Chester Carlson; William O. Douglas; Harry Ashmore
- Revenue: $1,657,574 (2015)
- Expenses: $887,333 (2015)

The Center for the Study of Democratic Institutions in Santa Barbara, California, was an influential think tank from 1959 to 1977. Its influence waned thereafter and it closed in 1987. It held discussions on subjects it hoped would influence public deliberation. It attained some controversy with its conference of student radical leaders in 1967, and with a suggested new U.S. Constitution proposed by Fellow Rexford G. Tugwell.

== History ==
It was founded in 1959 by Robert M. Hutchins. The center was an offshoot of the Fund for the Republic, which had been established with a $15 million grant from the Ford Foundation. In its later years, its greatest source of support was Chester Carlson, the inventor of the Xerox process. For a time, Associate Supreme Court Justice William O. Douglas was Chairman of the center's board of directors. In 1969 Hutchins reorganized the center, after which many associates departed.

Harry Ashmore served as president from 1969 to 1974. After Hutchins' death in 1977, the Center found it difficult to raise funds. It became affiliated with the University of California at Santa Barbara, which sold its real estate.

In 1988, it merged with the Los Angeles-based Institute for National Strategy.

== Prominent fellows ==
Fellows of the Center included: Stringfellow Barr, from 1959 to 1969; Elisabeth Mann Borgese from 1964-1978; education philosopher Frederick Mayer ("A History of Educational Thought"); Linus Pauling, from 1963 to 1967; Bishop James Pike, from 1966 to 1969; Robert Kurt Woetzel; Raghavan N. Iyer; and Harvey Wheeler.

New appointees following the 1969 reorganization included Jacque Fresco, director of The Venus Project, Alex Comfort of The Joy of Sex fame, Bertrand de Jouvenel, and Stanford biologist Paul R. Ehrlich, author of The Population Bomb.
