= Raghavan N. Iyer =

Indian academic, political theorist, and philosopher (1930–1995)

- Born: Raghavan Narasimhan Iyer; 10 March 1930; Madras, India
- Died: 20 June 1995 (aged 65); Santa Barbara, California, US
- Occupations: Academic, philosopher
- Spouse: Nandini Nanak Mehta (m. 1956)
- Children: Pico Iyer

Raghavan Narasimhan Iyer (10 March 1930 – 20 June 1995) was an Indian academic, political theorist and philosopher. Educated at Oxford, he was professor of political science at the University of California, Santa Barbara from 1965 to 1986, when he retired as professor emeritus. A founding member of the Santa Barbara branch of the United Lodge of Theosophists, he also co-founded the Institute of World Culture in Santa Barbara in 1976, and remained its president until 1986.

== Early life and background ==
Born in a brahmin family in Madras (now Chennai), India on 10 March 1930, Iyer was the son of Narasimhan Iyer and Lakshmi Iyer. A child prodigy, at age 15, he joined the University of Bombay, at Elphinstone College, where he met Nandini Nanak Mehta who would later become his wife. Aged 18, he started teaching at the University of Bombay; however, in 1950, he went to attend Oxford University as the only Rhodes Scholar from India. He graduated with a First in Philosophy, Politics and Economics. He attended Magdalen College (1950–1953) and Nuffield College (1953–54), where he became known as an orator and debater. He returned to India, married Mehta in 1956, and started working with the Government of India briefly, before returning to Britain, where he went on to receive his doctorate from Oxford in 1962, while serving as a fellow of St Antony's College.

== Career ==
After stints teaching at the Universities of Oslo, Ghana and Chicago, he moved to California in 1964 to become a member of the Center for the Study of Democratic Institutions, a think-tank run by Robert Hutchins that assembled many of the great minds of the time. He was a professor of political science at the University of California, Santa Barbara from 1965 to 1986, where he later became professor emeritus. He received standing ovations in packed classrooms for his memorable, entertaining, and seemingly improvised lectures. As a teacher, Iyer was an inspiration for many generations of students; accessible, kind, and eccentric, with a breadth of knowledge that was unique and engaging. Together with his wife, a professor of religious studies at Santa Barbara, he was the founder of the local branch of the United Lodge of Theosophists. Iyer and his wife also founded the Institute of World Culture in 1976, and was its president until 1986.

His major books include The Glass Curtain, Parapolitics: Toward the City of Man, The Moral and Political Thought of Mahatma Gandhi, and The Gupta Vidya. He also put together two collections of Gandhi's own writings (The Moral and Political Writings of Mahatma Gandhi and The Essential Writings of Mahatma Gandhi).

Iyer lived in Santa Barbara, where he died of complications resulting from pneumonia on 20 June 1995 at a local hospital. He was survived by his wife, Nandini Nanak Mehta (b. 1931, d. 2021), a professor of philosophy and religions, and son, Pico Iyer (b. 1957), a noted writer.
