= Ohio Academy of History =

Professional organization

The Ohio Academy of History is the professional society for historians who work or reside in the state of Ohio. It was founded in 1932. As its constitution specifies, its object is "to promote the study and teaching of history, historical research, and the publication of historical works; to encourage historical organizations, libraries, and archives; and to aid in the elevation of the general level of historical consciousness in the State of Ohio." Its membership is composed of amateur and professional historians and archivists from various backgrounds, including universities, colleges, high schools, elementary schools, libraries, historical societies, museums, archives, and the general public.

It holds two meetings each year: a fall business meeting and a spring conference where members and participants present scholarly research papers. These meetings are held at different colleges, universities and institutions around the state. It offers several awards each year, including the Distinguished Publication Award (since 1971), Distinguished Historian Award, Outstanding Dissertation Award (since 1995), Distinguished Service Award (since 1971), Public History Award and the Teaching Award (since 1981).

Selected papers presented at the annual conference are published in the Academy's Proceedings.

Beyond its academic mission, the Academy actively advocates for academic freedom and historical integrity. For example, it has publicly opposed legislation like Ohio Senate Bill 1, which it argues threatens open discourse and critical thinking in education.
