= American Studies Association's boycott of Israel =

Scholarly association boycott

The American Studies Association (ASA) began an ongoing boycott of Israeli educational institutions in December 2013. The ASA's decision to boycott was controversial because it was the first major American scholarly organization to do so. In April 2016, four ASA members aided by the Louis D. Brandeis Center for Human Rights Under Law sued the ASA, but the lawsuit was dismissed in 2019 when the judge ruled that plaintiffs lacked standing.

== Decision to boycott Israel ==
In December 2013, members of the ASA voted to join the boycott of all Israeli educational institutions. The boycott was in response to the Palestinian-led BDS movement which since 2005 has called for comprehensive boycotts against Israel for alleged human rights violations against the Palestinians. The vote followed a similar one taken in April 2013 by the Association for Asian American Studies (AAAS) to boycott Israeli educational institutions.

In a statement on the boycott, ASA's National Council encouraged members to vote in support of the boycott because of "Israel's violation of international law and UN resolutions; the documented impact of the Israeli occupation on Palestinian scholars and students; [and] the extent to which Israeli institutions of higher education are a party to state policies that violate human rights." Some faculty, however, have objected that it is inappropriate for senior administrators to publicly position their college or university on an issue that faculty believe is one of academic freedom.

After a ten-day online voting period, the resolution passed with 66.05 percent of voting members endorsing the boycott, 30.5 percent voting against it, and 3.43 percent abstaining.

The boycott has since been joined by the Native American and Indigenous Studies Association, the African Literature Association, the Critical Ethnic Studies Association, and the National Women's Studies Association. Organizations that have voted against similar resolutions include the Modern Language Association.

== Criticism ==
Israeli officials and the Anti-Defamation League reacted by stating that political and academic debates should not be mixed and accused the ASA of discrimination against Israel and "Orwellian antisemitism", a charge denied by supporters of the boycott such as George Bisharat, David Lloyd and Colin Dayan. The Israeli ambassador to the US, Ron Dermer, stated, "Rather than standing up for academic freedom and human rights by boycotting countries where professors are imprisoned for their views, the A.S.A. chooses as its first ever boycott to boycott Israel, the sole democracy in the Middle East, in which academics are free to say what they want, write what they want and research what they want." UCLA professor Robin D. G. Kelley argued that such statements “grossly mischaracterized” the ASA resolution “as an assault on academic freedom. On the contrary, it is one of the most significant affirmative acts any scholarly organization has proposed in defense of academic freedom since the anti-apartheid movement. Palestinian students and faculty living under occupation do not enjoy academic freedom, let alone the full range of basic human rights.”

Senior administrators at over 200 universities have rejected the academic boycott of Israel and four universities have withdrawn from the organization: Brandeis University, Indiana University, Kenyon College, and Penn State Harrisburg. Prominent university and college presidents who have publicly condemned the boycott include Columbia University President Lee C. Bollinger, Princeton University President Christopher L. Eisgruber, New York University President John Sexton, Amherst College President Carolyn Martin, University of Rochester President Joel Seligman, MIT President L. Rafael Reif, Wesleyan University President Michael S. Roth, Bard College President Leon Botstein, Case Western Reserve University President Barbara Snyder, Boston University president Robert A. Brown, Oberlin College President Marvin Krislov, and Harvard University President Drew Gilpin Faust.

The Association of American Universities, the American Association of University Professors, and the American Council on Education have all publicly denounced the boycott as a violation of the academic freedom of not only Israeli but also US scholars as well. The AMCHA Initiative maintains an updated list of universities that have terminated their ASA membership, and a list of universities that reject the boycott.

Some politicians have expressed criticism through open letters and legislation. Democratic Congressman Eliot Engel sent a letter to the ASA's president in which he criticized "the unfair double standard Israel is regularly and unfairly subjected to by organizations such as yours." In January 2014, 134 members of Congress (69 Democrats, 65 Republicans) signed a letter to ASA president Curtis Marez and president-elect Lisa Duggan, which accused the ASA of engaging in a "morally dishonest double standard." The letter stated that: "Like all democracies, Israel is not perfect. But to single out Israel, while leaving relationships with universities in autocratic and repressive countries intact, suggests thinly-veiled bigotry and bias."

Lawmakers in New York described the ASA boycott as "targeted discrimination against Israel that betrays the values of academic freedom that we hold dear." In January 2014, they put forward an anti-BDS law that would have banned universities and colleges from funding organizations that "have undertaken an official action boycotting certain countries or their higher education institutions." But the proposed law faced sharp criticism over its implications on free speech and was discarded.

Individual academics and commentators have sharply criticized the boycott through editorials and op-eds. George Mason University professor David Bernstein, described the ASA as having moved from, "the ordinary lunatic fringe" into "the racist lunatic fringe," and Stanley N. Katz of Princeton University questioned the practical effect of the resolution, stating that the ASA "lacks any formal ties with Israeli institutions in the first place." Canadian journalist Rex Murphy argued that the ASA "seeks to amputate all connection with thousands of other scholars. Not because of the content of those scholars’ ideas, their research, their intelligence, or their field of study. But because they are Israelis. Or teaching and researching in Israel."

In a January 2015 speech to Columbia Law School's Center for Law and Liberty, former Harvard University President Lawrence Summers said that in response to the ASA boycott, "universities should make clear that their names cannot be invoked as the purported sponsor for conferences or dialogues in which the primary thrust is demonization of Israel.... And it goes without saying that they should not allow themselves to be used as economic leverage against Israel."

Eight past ASA presidents have signed a letter which described the boycott as "antithetical to the mission of free and open inquiry for which a scholarly organization stands." The letter also criticized the fact that “ASA Members were provided only the resolution and a link to a website supporting it. Despite explicit requests, the National Council refused to circulate or post to the ASA’s website alternative perspectives."

== Response from the ASA ==
Curtis Marez, the president of the American Studies Association and an associate professor and chair of the ethnic-studies department at the University of California at San Diego has responded to critics of the boycott by arguing that the ASA is "targeting Israeli universities because they work closely with the government and military in developing weapons and other technology that are used to enforce the occupation and colonization of Palestinian land, while university-associated think tanks develop political and communications strategies to advance government aims and defend them internationally." He has also predicted that "one day, after the tide turns, boycotts against Israel and the apartheid regime it has instituted will be viewed in the same way" as the Academic boycott of South Africa during the years of apartheid is now viewed, and that this comparison is especially apt just after the death of Nelson Mandela.

Speaking to The New York Times, Marez argued that America has "a particular responsibility to answer the call for boycott because it is the largest supplier of military aid to the state of Israel." Marez acknowledged that the United States has previously, and is currently, the largest supplier of military aid to many governments, including some with poor human rights records, but explained that Israel is the only country in which "civil society groups" had specifically asked the ASA to launch a boycott. Further responding to accusations that the ASA was singling out Israel while ignoring many other nations that have comparable or even worse human rights records that Israel (including many of Israel's neighbors), Marez replied: "One has to start somewhere."

Marez has written on the organization's long-standing commitment to social justice, and the ASA's belief in nonviolent strategies as a tool to effect change. "The academic boycott of Israel," writes Marez, "is grounded in the same anti-discrimination principles as other historical divestment and boycott strategies used to protest repressive state practices, including those employed against the South Africa apartheid regime and racial segregation in the United States." Marez goes on to note that the United States Supreme Court holds these kinds of boycotts, ones which "aim to effect 'political, social, and economic change," to be constitutionally protected speech activities.

Additionally, some members of the ASA have linked their support of the boycott to their own studies. Angela Davis, a distinguished professor emerita at the University of California, Santa Cruz, wrote that “[t]he similarities between historical Jim Crow practices and contemporary regimes of segregation in Occupied Palestine make this resolution an ethical imperative for the ASA.” Professor Eric Cheyfitz of Cornell University, who is Jewish and has a daughter and three grandchildren who are Israeli citizens, wrote that “just as the myth of American exceptionalism seeks to erase the genocide and ongoing settler colonialism of Indigenous peoples here in the United States so the myth of Israeli exceptionalism seeks to erase Israeli colonialism in Palestine and claim original rights to Palestinian lands.”

== Lawsuit ==
In April 2016, four American studies professors, Simon J. Bronner, Michael Aaron Rockland, Michael Barton, and Charles Kupfer, sued ASA. They were aided by Kenneth L. Marcus of the Brandeis Center, Eugene Kontorovich, a legal expert and vocal opponent of BDS, and Jerome Marcus of the Israeli think tank Kohelet Policy Forum. The named defendants were Lisa Duggan, Curtis Marez, Avery Gordon, Nerferti Tadiar, Sunaina Maira and Chandan Reddy. New defendants were added in 2018. Among them, Steven Salaita, who wasn't on the Board when the boycott decision was taken but had campaigned for the boycott.

The plaintiffs alleged that the boycott violates Washington D.C. law, governing nonprofit corporations and that the adoption of the boycott violated the ASA's internal rules and procedures. The lawsuit alleged that the boycott fell outside the scope of the ASA's corporate charter and stated mission, a type of legal argument known as ultra vires. Kontorvich argued: "To be clear, this is not about silencing or stopping criticism of Israel, or in any way discouraging it. It is about non-profit corporations abiding by their own rules." The lawsuit characterized the defendants as "insurgents" who through "concerted effort" had sought to convert ASA "into a political advocacy organization".

The lawsuit was dismissed in 2019 when the judge ruled that plaintiffs lacked standing because they could not demonstrate that their injuries exceeded $75,000 which would have been required for federal litigation. Pro-Palestinian media heralded it as a victory, but the plaintiffs' lawyers vowed to continue the fight. However, in June 2020, the U.S. Court of Appeals for the D.C. Circuit unanimously upheld the district court's ruling which put a definite end to the case. The judges also noted that the plaintiffs hadn't tried to explain how the ASA boycott had injured them: "The Professors nowhere explain how they have suffered economic or reputational damage. They assert no loss of standing within their universities. They do not purport to have been denied tenure, promotions or other prestigious honors. Nor do they claim to have had their writings rejected by academic journals."

Two related cases brought forward by David Abrams of the Zionist Advocacy Center in the state of New York had previously been dismissed for "[demonstrating] neither injury nor standing to sue." In both cases, Abrams alleged injury over ASA's refusal to let Israeli organizations become members. But in the first case Abrams' International Legal Forum didn't actually attempt to join ASA and in the second case his organization, Athenaeum Blue & White, incorporated on the same day he filed the lawsuit, successfully became a member.

== See also ==
- Academic boycott of Israel
- BDS movement
- Boycotts of Israel
- List of organizations that have endorsed the BDS movement
