= List of supporters of the BDS movement =

The list of supporters of the BDS movement includes those who have either voiced support for the BDS movement or for comprehensive boycotts against Israel. The list does not include people who support boycotting products from Israeli settlements but not from Israel. The year column denotes the year they most recently professed support for such a boycott.

Name	Occupation	Country	Year	Ref.
Elmaz Abinader	Author and poet	United States	?	
Nadia Abu El-Haj	Anthropologist	United States	2016	
As'ad AbuKhalil	Professor of political science	United States	2015	
Susan Abulhawa	Writer	United States	2012	
Ali Abunimah	Journalist	United States	2009	
Rina Adams	Drag queen	Canada	2023	
Paul Ahmarani	Actor	Canada	2010	
Riz Ahmed	Actor and rapper	United Kingdom	2015	
Amani al-Khatahtbeh	Author and activist	United States	2014	
Hanan al-Shaykh	Writer	Lebanon	2015	
Lexi Alexander	Filmmaker	Germany	2023	
Tariq Ali	Activist, writer and journalist	United Kingdom	2015	
Udi Aloni	Filmmaker and activist	Israel	?	
Charlie Jane Anders	Writer	United States	2024	
Sinan Antoon	Poet and novelist	Iraq	2023	
Ser Anzoategui	Actor	United States	2023	
John Arden	Playwright	United Kingdom	?	
Fatimah Asghar	Poet	United States	2023	
Samantha Bailey	Director and writer	United States	2023	
Iain Banks	Author	United Kingdom	2013	
Omar Barghouti	Activist	Israel	2013	
Golbarg Bashi	Feminist activist and author	Sweden	2019	
Morgan Bassichis	Writer	United States	2023	
Upendra Baxi	Legal scholar	India	2010	
Brace Belden	Podcaster and activist	United States	2023	
Jonathan Beller	Film theorist and culture critic	United States	2014	
Oren Ben-Dor	Law professor	United Kingdom	2005	
Liam Benzvi	Singer-songwriter	United States	2023	
John Berger	Art critic	United Kingdom	2006	
Praful Bidwai	Journalist and political activist	India	2010	
George Bisharat	Law professor	United States	2014	
Hannah Black	Visual artist	United Kingdom	2023	
Max Blumenthal	Journalist	United States	2014	
Gabriel Boric	President	Chile	2022	
Joel Kim Booster	Actor	United States	2023	
Bosco	Drag queen	United States	2023	
Daniel Boyarin	Historian of religion	Israel	2014	
Russell Brand	Comedian and actor	United Kingdom	2014	
Lenni Brenner	Trotskyist writer	United States	2014	
Steve Brodner	Satirical illustrator and caricaturist	United States	2022	
Boygenius	Band	United States	2023	
Molly Burch	Singer-songwriter	United States	2023	
Cori Bush	Politician	United States	2020	
River Butcher	Actor and comedian	United States	2023	
Judith Butler	Philosopher and gender theorist	United States	2012	
David Calder	Actor	United Kingdom	2015	
Jibz Cameron	Artist	United States	2023	
Emily Carroll	Comic book artist	United States	2023	
Anna Carteret	Actress	United Kingdom	2015	
Julian Casablancas	Rock singer	United States	2021	
Michael Cavadias	Actor	United States	2023	
Matthew A. Cherry	Writer and director	United States	2023	
Caryl Churchill	Playwright	United Kingdom	?	
CocoRosie	Band	United States	2021, 2022	
Partha Chatterjee	Political scientist and anthropologist	United States	2016	
Parvesh Cheena	Actor	United States	2023	
Don Mee Choi	Poet and translator	United States	2023	
Franny Choi	Writer and poet	United States	2023	
Andrea Long Chu	Writer and critic	United States	2023	
T. J. Clark	Art historian	United Kingdom	2023	
Jeff Clark	Poet and book designer	United States	2023	
Joshua Clover	Writer and professor	United States	2023	
Max Collins	Musician	United States	2023	
Patrick Cottrell	Writer	United States	2023	
Shea Couleé	Drag queen	United States	2023	
Wilson Cruz	Actor	United States	2023	
Chuck D	Rapper	United States	?	
William Dalrymple	Historian	United Kingdom	2015	
Jesse Darling	Artist	United Kingdom	2023	
Lawrence Davidson	History professor	United States	2013	
Uri Davis	Academic and civil rights activist	Israel	2019	
Michael DeForge	Comic book artist and activist	Canada	2021	
Jason DeMarco	Producer	United States	2022	
Jamie Demetriou	Actor and comedian	United Kingdom	2023	
Rob DenBleyker	Cartoonist	United States	2023	
Saba Dewan	Documentary film maker	India	2010	
Junot Díaz	Writer and creative writing professor	United States	2014	
Danny Ducker	Artist and writer	United States	2023	
Cyrus Grace Dunham	Writer and activist	United States	2023	
John Early	Actor and comedian	United States	2023	
Brian Eno	Electronic musician	United Kingdom	2006	
Hedy Epstein	Political activist	United States	2014	
Annie Ernaux	Author and Nobel Laureate	France	2022	
Farid Esack	Scholar, writer and activist	South Africa	2018	
Cole Escola	Actor and comedian	United States	2023	
Samuel Farber	Professor Emeritus of Political Science	United States	2014	
Ashley Feinberg	Poet	United States	2023	
Lillian Fiedler	Artist and illustrator	United States	2023	
Sophie Fiennes	Film director and producer	United Kingdom	2006	
Dan Fishback	Artist	United States	2023	
Tara Flynn	Actress and writer	Ireland	2023	
Tyler Ford	Writer and activist	United States	2023	
Aminatta Forna	Writer	United Kingdom	2015	
Zack Fox	Comedian	United States	2023	
Rozanne Foyer	Trade union leader	United Kingdom	2020	
Cynthia G. Franklin	Literary and cultural critic	United States	2014	
Sasha Frere-Jones	Writer	United States	2023	
Steven Friedman	Academic and columnist	South Africa	2013	
Eduardo Galeano	Journalist	Uruguay	2006	
Janeane Garofalo	Actress and comedian	United States	2023	
Basel Ghattas	Politician	Israel	2016	
Jayati Ghosh	Development economist	India	2010	
Ruth Wilson Gilmore	Scholar	United States	2023	
Danny Glover	Actor and film maker	United States	?	
Jean-Luc Godard	Film director	France	2018	
Neve Gordon	Professor of international law	Israel	2009	
Lynn Gottlieb	Rabbi	United States	2014	
Hermitage Green	Band	Ireland	?	
Bonnie Greer	Playwright	United Kingdom	2015	
Broti Gupta	Writer and podcaster	United States	2023	
Mark Haddon	Writer	United Kingdom	2015	
Ghassan Hage	Professor of Anthropology at the University of Melbourne	Lebanese-Australian	2016	
Alex Hall	Writer	United States	2023	
Maggie Tokuda-Hall	Author	United States	2023	
Jeff Halper	Anthropologist and activist	Israel	2014	
Joel Harden	Politician	Canada	2017	
Jeremy Hardy	Comedian	United Kingdom	2015	
Githa Hariharan	Writer	India	2010	
Patti Harrison	Actress and comedian	United States	2023	
Malcolm Harris	Journalist	United States	2023	
Zoya Hasan	Academic and political scientist	India	2010	
Stephen Hawking	Physicist	United Kingdom	2013	
Howie Hawkins	Politician and activist	United States	2014	
Heems	Rapper	United States	2023	
Doug Henwood	Journalist	United States	2023	
Manny Hernandez	Writer and director	United States	2021	
Lauryn Hill	Singer, songwriter and rapper	United States	?	
Brandon Hoang	Writer and author	United States	2024	
Hermione Hoby	Author and journalist	United Kingdom	2023	
Mike Hodges	Screenwriter	United Kingdom	2015	
Adam Horowitz	Screenwriter and producer	United States	2014	
Jazmine Hughes	Writer and editor	United States	2023	
Jeremy Hunter	Musician	United States	2023	
Amin Husain	Activist, adjunct professor	United States	2015	
Juliana Huxtable	Artist	United States	2023	
Immortal Technique	Rapper and activist	United States	?	
Anne Ishii	Writer and translator	United States	2023	
Rami Ismail	Video game developer	Netherlands	2021	
Elizabeth Ito	Animator and writer	United States	2024	
Melody Iza	Writer and artist	United States	2023	
Sarah Jaffe	Journalist	United States	2023	
Selma James	Writer and activist	United States	2014	
Lauren Jauregui	Singer-songwriter	United States	2023	
Joey De Jesus	Writer and performer	United States	2023	
Brian Jones	Actor and educator	United States	2014	
Rebekah Jones	Geographer and activist	United States	2023	
Mitra Jouhari	Actress and comedian	United States	2023	
Asif Kapadia	Filmmaker	United Kingdom	2015	
Jamie Lauren Keiles	Writer and journalist	United States	2023	
Reem Kelani	Musician	United Kingdom	2006	
Kim Kelly	Journalist	United States	2023	
Kehlani	Singer and songwriter	United States	2023	
Amir Khadir	Politician and activist	Canada	2020	
Leila Khaled	Refugee and political activist	United States	2014	
Rashid Khalidi	Professor of Modern Arab Studies	United States	2016	
Soul Khan	Songwriter, rapper and politician	United States	2022	
Kiana Khansmith	Artist	United States	2023	
Zahi Khouri	Businessman	Palestine	2015	
David Klein	Mathematician	United States	?	
Naomi Klein	Author	Canada	2016	
Ian Knox	Political cartoonist	Ireland	?	
Maia Kobabe	Cartoonist and author	United States	2024	
Amina Koroma	Voice actress	United Kingdom	2021	
Peter Kosminsky	Writer, director and producer	United Kingdom	2015	
Ales Kot	Writer	United States	2023	
Hari Kunzru	Writer	United Kingdom	2015	
Molly Lambert	Journalist	United States	2023	
Paul Laverty	Screenwriter and lawyer	United Kingdom	2017	
Sam Lavigne	Artist	United States	2023	
Bobby LeFebre	Poet	United States	2023	
Mike Leigh	Film and theatre director	United Kingdom	2015	
Ronit Lentin	Sociologist and writer	Israel	2014	
Jonathan Lethem	Novelist	United States	2023	
Gideon Levy	Journalist	Israel	2018	
Sophie Lewis	Writer and scholar	United States	2023	
Wyvern Lingo	Band	Ireland	?	
Yoav Litvin	Writer and photographer	United States	2026	
Catherine Liu	Cultural theorist	United States	2023	
Jo Livingstone	Literary critic	United Kingdom	2023	
David Lloyd	Poet and professor of literature	United States	2009	
Phyllida Lloyd	Film director	United Kingdom	2015	
Ken Loach	Filmmaker	United Kingdom	2017	
Liz Lochhead	Poet	United Kingdom	2015	
Antony Loewenstein	Journalist	Australian German	2014	
Jennifer Loewenstein	Freelance journalist	United States	2014	
Jamie Loftus	Writer and comedian	United States	2023	
Amanda Lovelace	Poet	United States	2023	
Valeria Luiselli	Author	United States	2023	
Jake Lynch	Journalist and academic	Australia	2013	
Michael Lynk	Former United Nations Special Rapporteur on the situation of human rights in the Palestinian territories occupied since 1967	Canada	2022	
Moshé Machover	Mathematician	United Kingdom	2014	
Mandla Mandela	Politician	South Africa	2020	
Henning Mankell	Author	Sweden	2010	
Miriam Margolyes	Actress	United Kingdom	2014	
Mike Marqusee	Writer	United States	2014	
Don Martin	Rapper	Norway	?	
George R. R. Martin	Novelist	United States	2023	
Nur Masalha	Writer and academic	Israel	2014	
Joseph Massad	Professor in Political Science	United States	2016	
Vina Mazumdar	Academic and activist	India	2010	
Simon McBurney	Actor and playwright	United Kingdom	2015	
John McDonnell	Politician	United Kingdom	2023	
Jimmy McGovern	Screenwriter	United Kingdom	2015	
Will Menaker	Podcaster	United States	2023	
Iris Menas	Actor	United States	2023	
Hajo Meyer	Physicist	Netherlands	2010	
Roger Michell	Theatre, television and film director	United Kingdom	2015	
China Miéville	Writer	United Kingdom	2015	
Nicholas Mirzoeff	Visual culture theorist	United States	2015	
Kausar Mohammed	Actress	United States	2023	
Tumi Molekane	Rapper	South Africa	?	
Monaleo	Rapper	United States	2023	
Indya Moore	Actor and Model	United States	2023	
Thurston Moore	Musician	United States	?	
P.E. Moskowitz	Writer	United States	2023	
MUNA	Band	United States	2023	
Kandy Muse	Drag queen	United States	2023	
Innosanto Nagara	Children's book author and activist	United States	2010	
Hari Nef	Actress and model	United States	2023	
Emily Neves	Voice actress	United States	2023	
Bree Newsome	Filmmaker and activist	United States	2017	
Brittani Nichols	Actress and comedian	United States	2023	
Travis Nichols	Poet and novelist	United States	2024	
Yuh-Line Niou	Politician	United States	2022	
Ann Nocenti	Novelist	United States	2023	
Noname	Rapper	United States	2023	
Claire Norris	Writer and artist	United States	2023	
Geoffrey G. O'Brien	Poet	United States	2023	
Rebecca O'Brien	Film producer	United Kingdom	2017	
Claudia O'Doherty	Actress and writer	Australia	2023	
Andrew O'Hagan	Writer	United Kingdom	2015	
Tyler Oakley	Activist	United States	2023	
Daniel José Older	Writer	United States	2023	
Nikkita Oliver	Writer	United States	2023	
Bertell Ollman	Professor of politics	United States	2014	
Egil Olsen	Football manager	Norway	2010	
Ijeoma Oluo	Writer	United States	2023	
Ilhan Omar	Politician	United States	?	
Lee Knox Ostertag	Cartoonist and writer	United States	2023	
Emily X.R. Pan	Author	United States	2023	
Ilan Pappé	Historian and activist	Israel	2014	
Prabhat Patnaik	Marxist economist and political commentator	India	2010	
Miko Peled	Writer and activist	Israel	2014	
Nurit Peled-Elhanan	Philologist and professor of language	Israel	2014	
Miggs Perez	Writer and artist	United States	2023	
Megan Phonesavanh	Artist	United States	2024	
Tommy Pico	Writer and poet	United States	2023	
Hasan Piker	Streamer and political commentator	United States	2023	
Willow Pill	Drag queen	United States	2023	
Dougie Poole	Singer-songwriter	United States	2023	
Vijay Prashad	Marxist historian and political commentator	India	2014	
Questlove	Musician	United States	2021	
Walid Raad	Contemporary media artist	United States	2019	
Michael Radford	Film director	United Kingdom	2015	
Rage Against the Machine	Band	United States	2021	
Sara Ramirez	Actor	United States	2024	
Carlos Ramirez-Rosa	Politician	United States	2018	
Bella Ramsey	Actor	United Kingdom	2023	
Peter Ramsey	Illustrator and filmmaker	United States	2023	
Michael Ratner	Attorney	United States	2014	
Eva Reign	Actress	United States	2023	
Tanya Reinhart	Linguist and writer	Israel	2007	
Adrienne Rich	Poet and feminist	United States	?	
Sam Richardson	Actor	United States	2023	
Boots Riley	Rapper	United States	2014	
Tyson Rinehart	Voice actor	United States	2023	
Gabby Rivera	Writer	United States	2024	
Fariha Róisín	Writer	Australia	2023	
Sally Rooney	Author	Ireland	2021	
Steven Rose	Neuroscientist	United Kingdom	2014	
Michael Rosen	Author and poet	United Kingdom	2015	
Jonathan Rosenhead	Mathematician and activist	United Kingdom	2014	
Leon Rosselson	Songwriter	United Kingdom	2006	
Angelica Ross	Actress and businesswoman	United States	2023	
Spencer Rothbell	Writer and actor	United States	2023	
Arundhati Roy	Author	India	2010	
Josh Ruebner	Author and political analyst	United States	2014	
Nate Ruess	Musician	United States	2023	
Run the Jewels	Hip-hop duo	United States	2021	
Steven Salaita	Scholar and author	United States	2014	
Susan Sarandon	Actress	United States	2023	
Ash Sarkar	Journalist and political commentator	United Kingdom	2022	
Linda Sarsour	Activist	United States	2020	
Alexei Sayle	Comedian and actor	United Kingdom	2014	
Sarah Schulman	Writer and gay activist	United States	2013	
JD Scott	Poet	United States	2023	
Joan Wallach Scott	Historian	United States	2013	
Nicole Sealey	Poet	United States	2023	
Pete Seeger	American folk singer and activist	United States	2011	
Emily Segal	Artist and writer	United States	2023	
Emma Seligman	Director and screenwriter	Canada	2023	
Ser Serpas	Visual artist	United States	2023	
Aharon Shabtai	Poet and translator	Israel	?	
Kamila Shamsie	Writer	United Kingdom	2019	
Solmaz Sharif	Poet	United States	2023	
Warsan Shire	Writer and poet	United Kingdom	2023	
Jon Siebels	Musician	United States	2023	
Peter Silberman	Musician	United States	2021	
Hamed Sinno	Musician	United States	2023	
Jason Steele	Animator and writer	United States	2023	
Cat Stevens	Singer	United States	2022	
Gillian Slovo	Writer	South Africa	2015	
George Smith	Biologist	United States	2019	
Patti Smith	Musician	United States	2021	
Ahdaf Soueif	Novelist and commentator	Egypt	2014	
Dean Spade	Lawyer and activist	United States	2023	
Jill Stein	Physician and activist	United States	2016	
Elia Suleiman	Film director and actor	Palestine	2006	
Nandini Sundar	Sociologist	India	2010	
Paige L. Sweet	Sociologist	United States	2023	
Serj Tankian	Musician	United States	2021	
Lisa Taraki	Journalist, teacher, and sociologist	Palestine	2004	
Courtney Taylor	Actress	United States	2024	
Kae Tempest	Spoken word performer and playwright	United Kingdom	2018	
Julien Temple	Film and music video director	United Kingdom	2015	
Rashida Tlaib	Politician	United States	?	
Jia Tolentino	Writer and editor	United States	2023	
Julio Torres	Writer and comedian	United States	2023	
Alberto Toscano	Cultural critic and translator	Italy	2023	
Aivi Tran	Musician and composer	United States	2024	
Desmond Tutu	Archbishop	South Africa	2014	
UB40	Band	United Kingdom	2022	
Sasha Velour	Drag queen	United States	2023	
Eva Victor	Actress and comedian	United States	2023	
Alice Walker	Author	United States	2012	
Jackie Walker	Activist	United Kingdom	2019	
Lilly Wachowski	Filmmaker	United States	2023	
Jackie Wang	Professor and author	United States	2023	
Marina Warner	Writer	United Kingdom	2015	
Roger Waters	Musician	United Kingdom	2023	
Duncan Webb	Politician	New Zealand	2019	
Cornel West	Philosopher and activist	United States	2019	
Nadia Whittome	Politician	United Kingdom	2022	
Will Wiesenfeld	Musician	United States	2023	
Chris Williamson	Politician	United Kingdom	2018	
Raquel Willis	Writer and activist	United States	2023	
Alex Winter	Actor	United States	2022	
Rebecca Wolff	Poet	United States	2023	
Alice Wong	Activist	United States	2024	
Alyssa Wong	Writer	United States	2024	
Jamila Woods	Singer-songwriter	United States	2023	
Wendy Xu	Poet	United States	2024	
Bowen Yang	Actor and comedian	Australia	2023	
Eugene Lee Yang	Actor and filmmaker	United States	2023	
Charlyne Yi	Actor and comedian	United States	2024	
Jamal Zahalka	Politician	Israel	2014	
Benjamin Zephaniah	Writer	United Kingdom	2015	
Jenny Zhang	Writer and poet	United States	2023	
Haneen Zoabi	Politician	Israel	2019	

== See also ==
- Boycott, Divestment and Sanctions
- List of opponents of the BDS movement
- List of organizations that have endorsed the BDS movement
