= List of organizations that have endorsed the BDS movement =

List of organizations that support the BDS movement include organizations that either has supported the Boycott, Divestment and Sanctions (BDS) movement or has endorsed comprehensive boycotts of Israel. Comprehensive is here defined as a boycott that is not tied to a particular industry (e.g weapons embargo) or exclusiveupdate tag to goods from the Israeli settlements. The list does not include organizations that support BDS' right to call for a boycott of Israel but does not themselves support the boycott. The year column indicates when the organization first professed support for BDS.

Organization	Type	Members	Region	Year
Edinburgh University Students' Association (Note: The motion passed 249 to 153 with 22 absentions but were later overturned.)	Student union	41,300	United Kingdom	2016
The Harvard Crimson Editorial Board	Editorial board	87	United States	2022
Teaching Assistants Association	Trade union	9,000	United States	2016
Muslim Student Union	Student union	?	United States	2010
National Lawyers Guild	Bar association	?	United States	2020
Union of Agricultural Work Committees	Farmers' union	?	Palestine	2012
Canadian Union of Postal Workers	Trade union	54,000	Canada	2018
Association pour une solidarité syndicale étudiante	Student union	?	Canada	2008
Fédération des femmes du Québec	Feminist organization	?	Canada	2010
Centrale des syndicats du Québec	Trade union	180,000	Canada	2018
Democratic Socialists of America	Political organization	?	United States	2017
Palestinian General Federation of Trade Unions	Trade union	290,000	Palestine	?
Socialist Left Party	Political party	?	Norway	2019
ARIJ (Note: Signatory to the BDS call)	Think tank	?	Palestine	2005
Addameer	Prisoner support	?	Palestine	2005
Palestinian NGOs Network	Umbrella org. for NGOs	134	Palestine	?
Movement for Black Lives	Coalition of human rights groups	50+	United States	2016
Boycott from Within	Political group	?	Israel	?
New Profile	Political group	?	Israel	2019
Women in Black	Anti-war group	10,000	International	?
BRISMES	Scholarly organization	?	United Kingdom	2019
LO	Trade union	900,000	Norway	2017
Ma'an News Agency	Wire service	n/a	Palestine	2005
Israeli Committee Against House Demolitions	Human rights NGO	?	Israel	2010
War on Want	Anti-poverty charity	?	United Kingdom	2018
National Union of Journalists (Note: In 2014, NUJ voted against a motion supporting boycotts of all Israeli goods and BDS.)	Trade union	40,000	United Kingdom	2007
Union of Students in Ireland	Student union	374,000	Ireland	2018
Irish Congress of Trade Unions	Trade union	600,000	Ireland	2009
Scottish Trades Union Congress	Trade union	560,000	United Kingdom	2009
University and College Union	Trade union	120,000	United Kingdom	2010
National Union of Students	Student union	Millions	United Kingdom	2015
National Campus and Community Radio Association	NGO of radio stations	?	Canada	2011
Mennonite Church Canada	Church	31,000	Canada	2016
Unifor	Trade union	310,000	Canada	2017
Concordia Graduate Students Association	Student union	8,000	Canada	2013
Concordia Student Union	Student union	?	Canada	2014
York Federation of Students	Student union	?	Canada	2013
Scarborough Campus Students' Union	Student union	14,000	Canada	2020
American Friends Service Committee	Religious society	Thousands	United States	2019
NATFHE (Note: The motion calling for an academic boycott of Israel was only in effect a few days before the union merged with the Association of University Teachers at which point it was reduced to advisory status.)	Trade union	69,000	United Kingdom	2006
CUT	Trade union	20 million	Brazil	?
Trades Union Congress	Trade union	7 million	United Kingdom	?
Canadian Union of Public Employees	Trade union	700,000	Canada	2006
UE	Trade union	35,000	United States	2015
Hampshire College	Private college	n/a	United States	2009
Jewish Voice for Peace	Human rights NGO	?	United States	2015
American Studies Association	Scholarly organization	5,000	United States	2013
Association for Asian American Studies	Scholarly organization	?	United States	2013
American Anthropological Association	Scholarly organization	10,000+	United States	2023
Association for Humanist Sociology	Scholarly organization	?	United States	?
NACCS	Scholarly organization	?	United States	?
NAISA	Scholarly organization	?	United States	?
Middle East Studies Association of North America	Scholarly organization	?	United States	?
National Women's Studies Association	Scholarly organization	2,350	United States	2015
Congress of South African Trade Unions	Trade union	?	South Africa	2011
National Union of Teachers	Trade union	?	United Kingdom	2014
Unite the Union	Trade union	?	United Kingdom	2014
UAW Local 2865 (Note: A year after the UAW Local 2865 adopted its resolution in support of the BDS, the UAW International Executive Board "nullified" the vote.)	Trade union	14,000	United States	2014
Confédération des syndicats nationaux	Trade union	325,000	Canada	2015
African National Congress	Political party	769,000	South Africa	2012
Green Party of England and Wales	Political party	?	England and Wales	2014
Scottish Greens	Political party	?	Scotland	2015
Green Party of Canada	Political party	?	Canada	2016
Socialist International	?	?	?	2018
Greens New South Wales	Political party	3,000	Australia	2010
Québec solidaire	Political party	?	Canada	?
Students for Justice in Palestine	Human rights NGO	?	International	?
All India Kisan Sabha	Peasant movement	16 million	India	2017
Canadian Federation of Students	Student union	500,000	Canada	2018
Association des Travailleurs Grecs du Québec	Immigrant labor organization	?	Canada	?
NDN Collective	Human rights NGO	?	United States	2021
Students' Federation of India	Scholarly organization	4,300,405	India	2018
Latin American Council of Social Sciences	Scholarly organization	?	International	2022
University of Melbourne Student Union	Student union	?	Australia	2022
National Conference of Black Lawyers	Human rights NGO	?	United States	2021
Green Party of California	Political party	85,828	United States	2022
Anglican Church of Southern Africa	Church	?	South Africa	2019
United Church of Christ	Church	773,500	United States	2015
Northern Independence Party	Political party	1,400	United Kingdom	2023
Fourth International	Political organisation	?	International	2010
Muslim Students Federation (Kerala state)	Student union	200,000	International	2006
Plaid Cymru	Political party	10,000	Wales	2024
Disoccupied	Boycott website	?	International	2023
United Church of Canada	Church	600,000	Canada	2015

== See also ==
- BDS movement
- List of supporters of the BDS movement
- List of opponents of the BDS movement
