= Litvin (surname) =

Litvin (masculine), Litvina (feminine) is a Russian-language surname literally meaning "Lithuanian person". Surnames with similar spellings exist in some other Slavic cultures. It may also be a transliteration from Yiddish ליטווין and one of the transliterations of Ukrainian Литвин (official transliteration: Lytvyn). The surname or nickname 'Litvin' may refer to:

- Aníbal Litvin, Argentine writer and journalist
- Michalon Litvin, Russian name of Michalon the Lithuanian, medieval chronicler
- Mikhail Litvin, Kazakhstani sprinter
- Natasha Litvin, birth name of Natasha Spender, English pianist and author
- Rachel 'Ray' Litvin (1890-1977), actor, mother of Natasha Spender
- Vladimir Litvin, Russian name of Volodymyr Lytvyn, Ukrainian politician
- Yoav Litvin, American writer, scientist and photographer
- Yuliya Litvina, Kazakhstani swimmer
- Zhanna Litvina, Belarusian journalist
