= Kyle Chayka =

American journalist and cultural critic

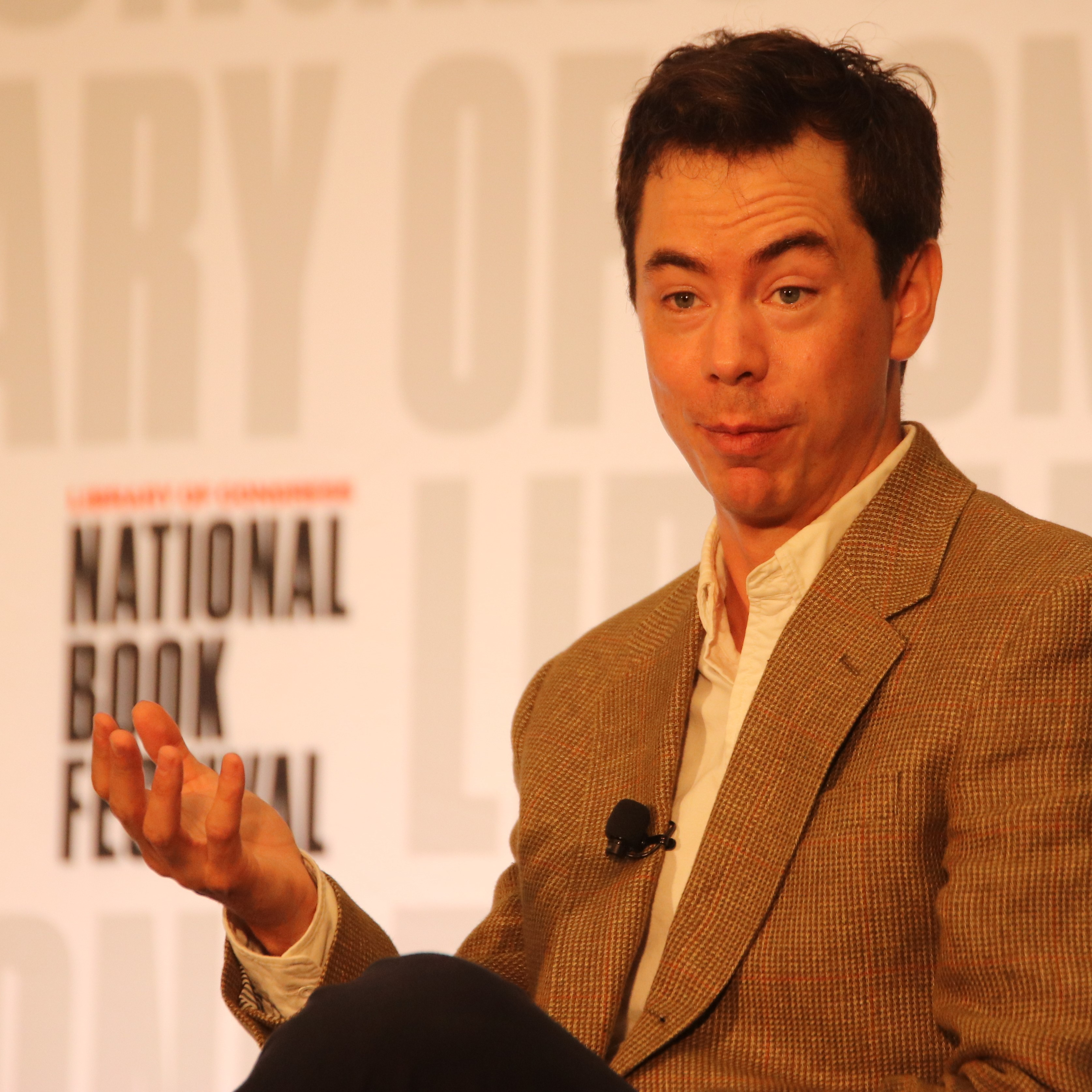
- Chayka at the 2024 National Book Festival
- Born: 1988 or 1989 (age 37–38)
- Education: Tufts University (BA)
- Occupation: Journalist
- Employer: The New Yorker
- Spouse: Jess Bidgood (m. 2023)
- Website: kylechayka.com

Kyle Chayka (born 1988 or 1989) is an American journalist and cultural critic.

== Early life and education ==
Chayka grew up in New Milford, Connecticut, graduating from New Milford High School in 2006. As a teenager, he published a blog entitled "Verbal Diarrhea" and played the role-playing game Ragnarok Online.

He studied art history and international relations at Tufts University, editing The Tufts Daily and earning a Bachelor of Arts in 2010.

== Career ==
Chayka was the first staff writer of the arts magazine Hyperallergic, becoming a senior editor for the publication in 2012.

In 2015, Chayka and P.E. Moskowitz founded Study Hall, a publication and community for media workers.

As a freelance journalist, Chayka covered art and aesthetics. In a 2016 essay for The Verge, he coined the term "AirSpace" to describe the prevalence of "sameness" across cafes and offices around the world.

In 2021, he became a staff writer for The New Yorker, where he writes the "Infinite Scroll" column on digital culture.

== Personal life ==
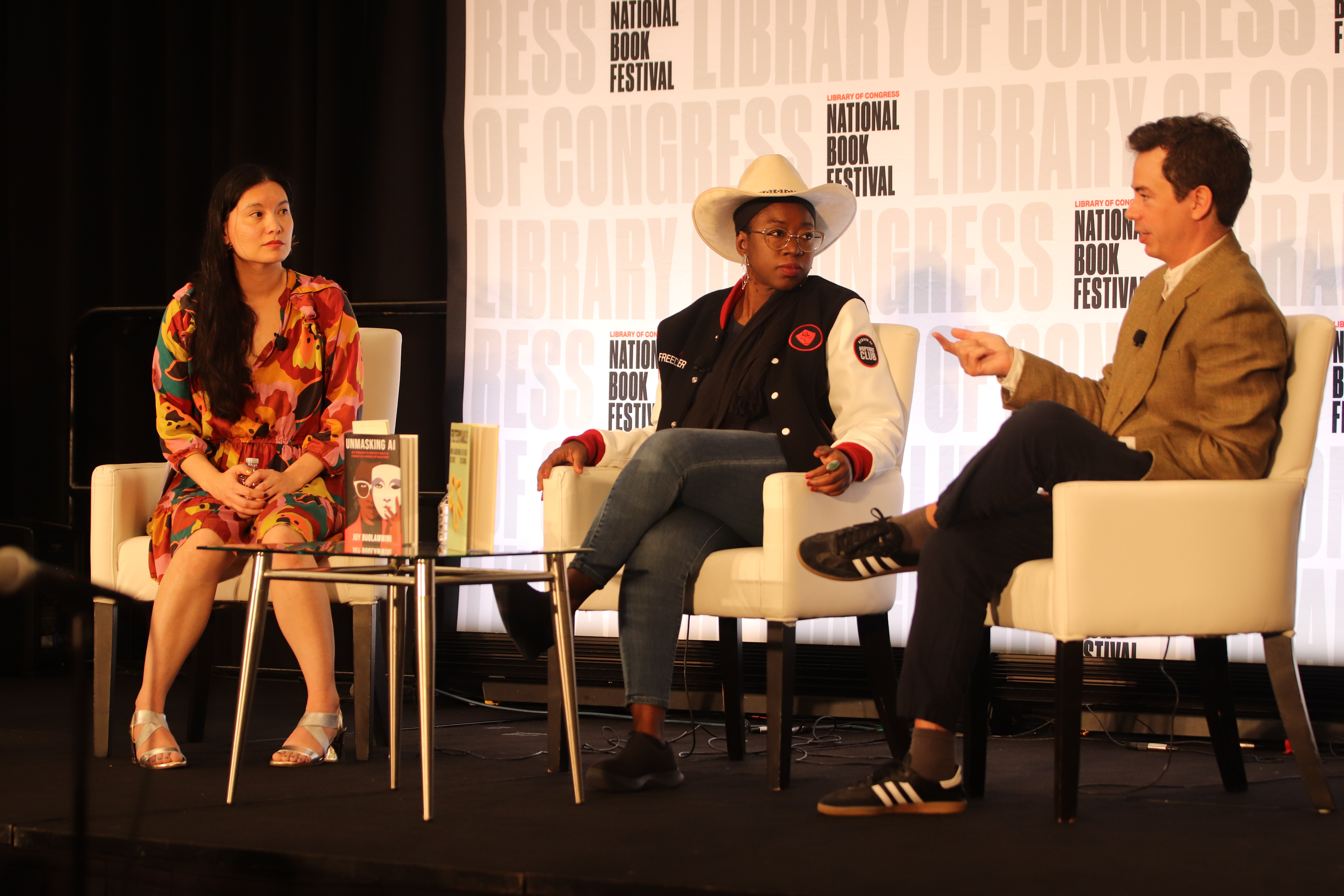
Chayka at the 2024 National Book Festival with moderator Regina Barber, left, and Joy Buolamwini

Chayka is married to The New York Times politics reporter Jess Bidgood, whom he met at Tufts. They live in Washington, D.C. with their Plott hound, Rhubarb.

== Bibliography ==
=== Books ===
- The Longing for Less: Living with Minimalism, 2020. ISBN 9781635572100. Explores the evolution of the minimalism movement.
- Filterworld: How Algorithms Flattened Culture, 2024. ISBN 978-0385548281. Discusses the cultural impacts of recommendation algorithms.

=== Selected articles ===
- "Welcome to AirSpace: How Silicon Valley Helps Spread the Same Sterile Aesthetic Across the World". The Verge. 3 August 2016.
- "What Google Search Isn’t Showing You", The New Yorker, March 10, 2022. Retrieved July 2, 2024.
- "The Millennial Aesthetic Comes for Your Vacuum Cleaner", The New Yorker, March 31, 2022. Retrieved July 2, 2024.
- "The Online Spaces That Enable Mass Shooters", The New Yorker, May 19, 2022. Retrieved July 2, 2024.
- "The Age of Algorithmic Anxiety", The New Yorker, July 25, 2022. Retrieved July 2, 2024.
