= The Longing for Less =

2020 book by Kyle Chayka

- First edition
- Author: Kyle Chayka
- Language: English
- Subject: Minimalism
- Genre: Nonfiction
- Publisher: Bloomsbury
- Publication date: 21 January 2020
- Pages: 272
- ISBN: 9781635572100

The Longing for Less: Living with Minimalism is a nonfiction book by American writer Kyle Chayka that explores the concept of minimalism. It was published in January 2020 by Bloomsbury.

== Synopsis ==
The book investigates minimalism in modern times. Its aim is to gain further understanding into this movement's rise in popularity. Chayka does this by tracking the origins of minimalism back to a 1965 essay by Richard Wollheim. The original 1965 essay describes minimalism as acting in opposition to more traditional art forms. Whereas traditional art tries to convey a specific message to the viewer, minimalism allows the viewer to form their own message from the art. Chayka argues that minimalism has taken on a new meaning, representing something much different than its origin. He pushes against this modern minimalism, arguing that it has caused us to consume more, rather than less.
