= Filterworld: How Algorithms Flattened Culture =

Social Sciences Book

Filterworld: How Algorithms Flattened Culture is a 2024 non-fiction book by Kyle Chayka.

== Synopsis ==
The book is about how internet algorithms change our culture. It is not just about phone apps or websites. It is about how the internet changes the real world. The author looks at sites and apps like Spotify, TikTok, Instagram, and Netflix. They use code to tell us what to watch, listen to, and buy. The main point is that this makes everything look and sound the same. The author calls this the "Filterworld." He says algorithms ruin our personal taste. They stop us from finding cool things by accident. This changes physical places too. For example, coffee shops and Airbnbs all over the world look the exact same now. People design them just to look good in pictures online. The book shows how algorithms also change fashion, food, and art. Creators make things just to get clicks. The author says we should find things on our own and stop trusting a feed.

== Reception ==
The New York Times Book Review reviewed the book. The review mentioned the clear writing style. The review covered that the text depicts a "corporate dystopia." The review also mentioned that older readers might find the premise bleak. The review added that younger users might see it as naive. The Washington Post also published a review. The review mentioned a sense of grief over corporate consolidation. It compared today's platforms to the early Web. Matt Pearce wrote a review for the Los Angeles Times. He discussed the author's definition of the word taste. He wrote that this concept does not prove a cultural decline. Pearce compared the book's themes to historical anxieties about art. He mentioned these concerns appear when all opinions are treated as equal.
