= Michael Aaron Rockland =

American writer (1935–2026)

- Born: July 14, 1935; New York City, U.S.
- Died: March 22, 2026 (aged 90)
- Education: B.A., 1955, M.A., 1960, Ph.D., 1968
- Occupations: Author, journalist, academic
- Spouse: Mae Cecilia Shafter (married 1954 or 1955–1977)

Michael Aaron Rockland (July 14, 1935 – March 22, 2026) was an American writer, journalist and academic who was a Professor of American Studies at Rutgers University.

== Early life ==
Rockland was born in The Bronx, New York City, on July 14, 1935, to Milton and Bessie Rockland. He attended Hunter College. Upon graduation, he was drafted into the U.S. Navy and served two years in Yokosuka, Japan as a medic working in a locked psychiatric ward for American military personnel. This experience gave rise to his memoir, Navy Crazy.

Honorably discharged in 1957, he began work on his Masters and Ph.D. in American Studies at the University of Minnesota. He was then attracted to government by John F. Kennedy. Entering the diplomatic service in 1961, Rockland served seven years, including two with the American embassy in Argentina as a cultural officer and four with the embassy in Spain as both a cultural officer and Director of the Casa Americana.

Leaving the diplomatic service in 1968 because of differences over the Vietnam War, he accepted a position in New Jersey as Executive Assistant to the Chancellor of Higher Education. Rutgers University then hired him as a dean whose main function would be negotiating peace between an increasingly rebellious, anti-Vietnam student body and faculty and the state legislature.

After several years as a dean, he gave up administration, became a professor and then alternated between writing for scholarly and general audiences.

== New Jersey culture ==
Four of Rockland's books and a movie focus on New Jersey. The first, which he co-authored with fellow Rutgers professor Angus Kress Gillespie in 1989, was Looking for America on the New Jersey Turnpike. The book documented the Turnpike as "the purest expression of a distinctly American industrial esthetic". A second expanded edition was published in 2024.

Snowshoeing Through Sewers included stories such as "Afoot in New Jersey," about an ambulatory pilgrimage he made across the state. The author urges such urban adventures "through our own habitat" as equal to the traditional wilderness based ones. The book, with 10 such adventures, followed the PBS-funded movie, Three Days on Big City Waters, which concerned two Rutgers professors who paddled across New Jersey until they land among the ruins of Ellis Island and, eventually, reach Manhattan. Rockland co-wrote the script for this film and acted the role of one of the professors.

Another New Jersey-oriented book, written in 2001 with his wife, Patricia M. Ard, was titled The Jews of New Jersey: A Pictorial History.

In 2008, he wrote The George Washington Bridge: Poetry in Steel, an "affectionate history" of the bridge, after discovering that there had been countless books on the Brooklyn Bridge, while there had never been one on the George Washington Bridge. The GWB, as its often known, is still the busiest bridge in the world, and he considered it equal in importance to the Brooklyn from an historical, engineering, and aesthetic perspective.

Rockland was interviewed about these books on NPR, PBS, and other national and international media. All of Rockland's New Jersey writings argue for the importance of the state, contradicting its many critics who often regard it as a national joke. Robert Pirsig, author of the classic Zen and the Art of Motorcycle Maintenance, wrote about one of his New Jersey-oriented works, "Rockland isn't just observing ... he's in it all the way, fighting the old clichés."

In addition to his books, Rockland wrote some 60 feature stories on New Jersey for the Sunday New York Times, for several general circulation magazines, but especially for New Jersey Monthly magazine, for which he was a contributing writer. Rockland also wrote the article in the Encyclopedia of New Jersey on New Jersey's image.

Rockland pioneered the term and the course "Jerseyana" at Rutgers University and served for years as the cultural commentator on PBS's New Jersey Nightly News.

He has long argued for dropping New Jersey's nickname "The Garden State" (a misnomer for America's most densely populated state), in favor of the "Bill of Rights' State", since New Jersey was first to ratify the first ten amendments to the Constitution.

== America on the international stage ==
Rockland's interest in America on the international scene began during his diplomatic career. His first book, Sarmiento's Travels in the United States in 1847, concerned the Argentine President, Domingo Faustino Sarmiento, and his friendship with Americans such as Ralph Waldo Emerson, Henry Wadsworth Longfellow, and Horace Mann, about which virtually nothing had been known before. In this book he argued that the United States had all but ignored its sister nations of the hemisphere and that the time had come for Americans to "look South."

Rockland next edited America in the Fifties and Sixties: Julián Marías on the United States, after Marías, then Spain's leading living philosopher, recruited him to take on this project.

Rockland's years in Spain were the inspiration for a memoir, An American Diplomat in Franco Spain. The memoir includes chapters on days Rockland spent essentially alone with Martin Luther King Jr. and Senator Ted Kennedy in Madrid, as well as the embassy's involvement in an infamous Cold War incident where the United States accidentally dropped four unarmed hydrogen bombs on Spain.

Much of the action in Rockland's first novel, A Bliss Case, takes place in and concerns India. The New York Times called it "written with a light touch and a near-perfect ear for humbug".

== Personal life ==
Rockland and his first wife, Mae Shafter, had three children, David, Keren and Jeffrey. Rockland and his second wife, Patricia Ard, had two children, Joshua and Kate. He had 13 grandchildren and two great grandchildren.

Rockland's historic home in Morristown, New Jersey, was used as the setting of the 1998 Meryl Streep film One True Thing.

Rockland died on March 22, 2026, at the age of 90 in Morristown, New Jersey.

== Awards and honors ==
He was awarded four Fulbright fellowships—to Argentina, Uruguay, Peru, and Norway. Other awards have included the Mary C. Turpie National Teaching Award in American Studies in 1997 and the Scholar-Teacher Award of Rutgers University in 2003.

Rockland's book, Sarmiento's Travels in the United States in 184,7 was chosen by The Washington Post as one of the "Fifty Best Books of the Year". Similarly, his novel, A Bliss Case, was chosen by The New York Times as one of the "Fifty Notable Books of the Year".

Rockland's long career writing and teaching about New Jersey was recognized in 2013 when he received the Governor Richard J. Hughes Award from the New Jersey Historical Commission for "lifetime achievement and contributions to New Jersey history".

== Major works ==
=== Scholarship ===
- Sarmiento's Travels in the United States in 1847 (1970) Princeton UP
- America in the Fifties and Sixties: Julián Marías on the United States (1972) Penn. State UP
- The American Jewish Experience in Literature (1975). University of Haifa
- Homes on Wheels (1980). Rutgers UP
- Looking for America on the New Jersey Turnpike (1989). With Angus Kress Gillespie. Rutgers UP
- What's American About American Things? (1996). University of Leon
- Popular Culture: Or Why Study Trash? (1999). University of Leon
- The Jews of New Jersey: A Pictorial History (2002). With Patricia Ard. Rutgers UP
- The George Washington Bridge: Poetry in Steel (2008) Rutgers UP

=== Memoir ===
- Snowshoeing Through Sewers (1994) Rutgers UP
- An American Diplomat in Franco Spain (2012) University of Valencia 92011); Hansen Publishing (2012)
- Navy Crazy (2014) Hansen Publishing

=== Fiction ===
- A Bliss Case (1989). Coffee House Press
- Stones (2009) Hansen Publishing

=== Screenplay ===
- Three Days on Big City Waters (1974). With Charles Woolfolk. Producer-Director, Clark Santee. P.B.S.
