= Karl Marx and the Anarchists =

1980 book by Paul Thomas

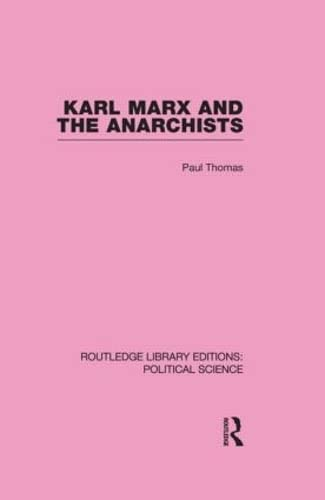
- 2012 edition
- Author: Paul Thomas
- Publisher: Routledge & Kegan Paul
- Publication date: 1980
- Pages: 406

Karl Marx and the Anarchists is a 1980 history book by Paul Thomas.
