= Mae Rockland Tupa =

American artist and author (born 1937)

Mae Rockland Tupa (born Mae Cecilia Shafter; December 18, 1937) is a Jewish American artist and author specializing in ceramics and textile arts. Mae taught at the Princeton Art Association, published seven books with Schocken Books, and created many works of art; the most notable of which is "Miss Liberty" (housed at The Jewish Museum in New York City), created in 1974.

== Early life and education ==
Born on December 18, 1937 in the Bronx, NY, Mae attended and graduated from Music & Art High School in New York City. She married her first husband, Michael Aaron Rockland, after her first year at Hunter College at age 17. They moved to Japan for one year as Michael served in the U.S. Navy and then relocated to Minnesota, where Mae completed her BFA in printmaking at the University of Minnesota.

== Family ==
Mae and Michael were married for 22 years, after which they separated in 1977. They had two sons, David and Jeffrey Rockland, and a daughter, Keren Rockland. Upon moving to Brookline, Massachusetts after the separation, Mae met Myron Alfred Tupa, an artist and high school teacher, and married him in 1979. They continue to reside in Brookline, MA.

== Artistic and written work ==
When living in Japan, Mae taught ceramics classes to the servicemen in the U.S. Navy with her husband. Upon arriving back in the United States and finishing her BFA, she also came to love printmaking and diversified her mediums. Moving between Buenos Aires and Madrid due to her first husband's job with the United States Foreign Service, Mae held solo and joint exhibitions of her art alongside Argentinean and Spanish artists between 1961 and 1967. Settling in Princeton, New Jersey in 1967, Mae began teaching textile classes at the Princeton Art Association and her synagogue. Additionally, she joined the Pomegranate Guild of Judaic Needlework and held an exhibition at the Nassau Gallery at Princeton.

Beginning in 1973, Mae published seven books: The Work of Our Hands: Jewish Needlecraft for Today (1973); The Hanukkah Book (1975); The Jewish Yellow Pages: A Directory of Goods and Services (1976); The Jewish Party Book: A Contemporary Guide to Customs, Crafts, and Foods (1978); The New Jewish Yellow Pages (1980); The Hanukkah Book: Games, Activities, and Gift Suggestions for the Whole Family, an updated version of the 1975 publication (1985); and The New Work of Our Hands: Contemporary Jewish Needlework and Quilts (1994).

In addition to her writing, Mae has consistently produced physical works of art throughout her life. Notable pieces include a quilt, "Promise"; a menorah made from Statue of Liberty statues, "Miss Liberty"; a print, "Jonah".
