= Terrell Carver =

American political theorist

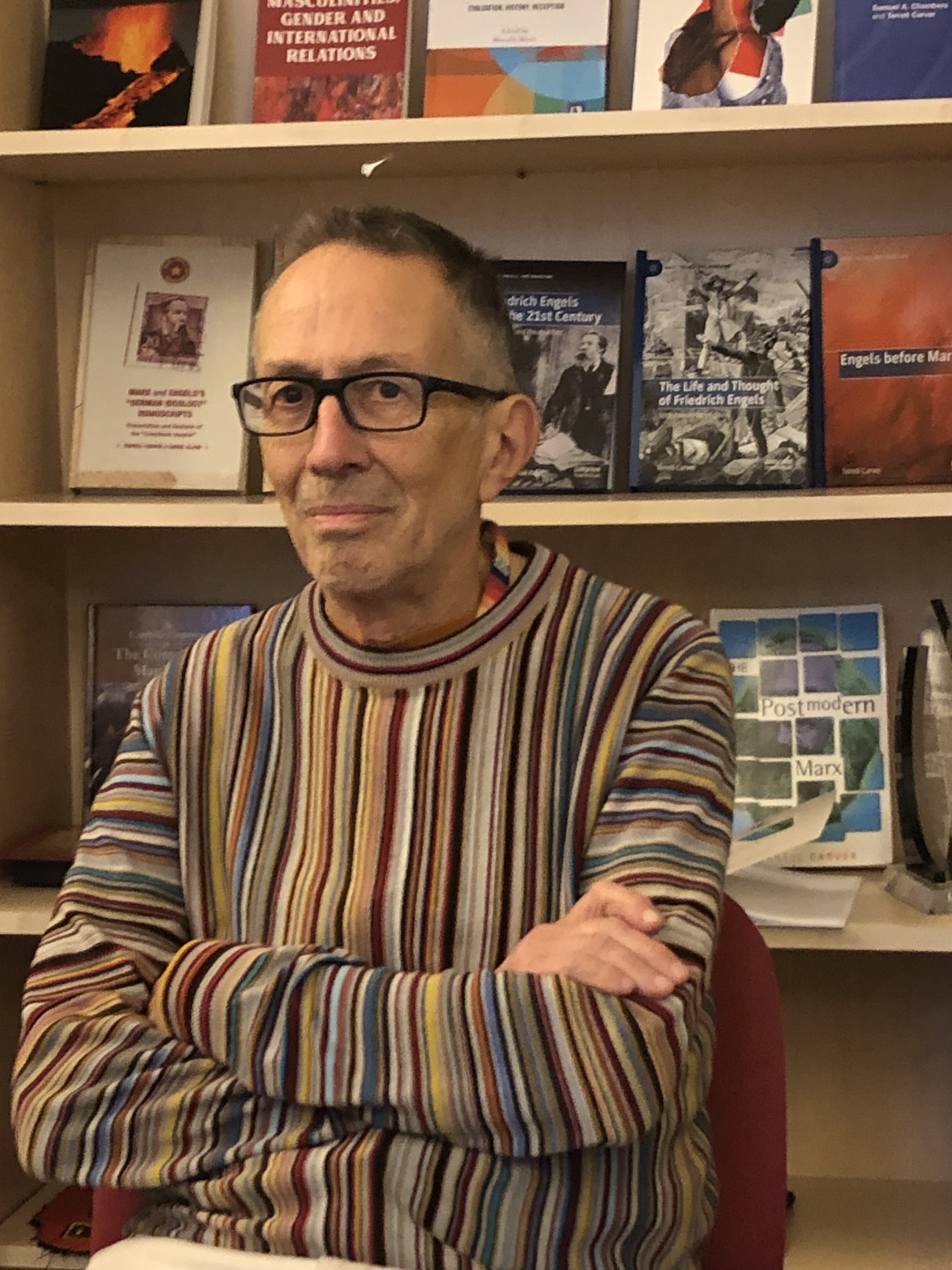
- Born: Terrell Foster Carver; September 4, 1946 (age 80); Boise, Idaho, U.S.
- Education: Columbia University, Oxford University
- Occupation: Professor of Political Theory

Terrell Foster Carver (born 4 September 1946) is a political theorist and academic.

== Career ==
Carver was born in Boise, Idaho, in 1946, and grew up there, graduating from Boise High School in 1964. After receiving his B.A. summa cum laude in Government and History from Columbia University in 1968, Carver was awarded Columbia's Kellett Fellowship for graduate study in England.

After finishing his BPhil (1970) and DPhil (1975) at Balliol College of Oxford University, he pursued an academic career, becoming a lecturer at the University of Liverpool in 1974. In 1980, Carver moved to the University of Bristol where in 1995 he was appointed Professor of Political Theory in the Department of Politics (later School of Sociology, Politics and International Studies). Carver became a naturalised British citizen in 2013.

At Bristol, Carver organised and taught various undergraduate and postgraduate modules, including Contemporary Feminist Thought, Postmodern Political Theory, and Gender, Masculinities and International Relations, as well as methodological seminars in Discourse and Visual Analysis and supervisions and examinations for numerous PhD students. He served as Head of the Politics Department (1999–2004) and administratively in the university's Study Abroad Programme for exchanges and student recruitment (1987–2007).

Alongside his teaching, Carver has contributed substantially to various fields of research, including Marx, Engels and Marxism; philosophy of social science, post-structuralism and feminist theory; and sex, gender and sexuality studies, notably men's and masculinity studies; contributing numerous articles to standard works of reference. His study Men in Political Theory (2004) remains unique. Besides doing his own translations of Marx's Later Political Writings (1996) for Cambridge University Press, Carver investigated the exact roles played by Engels in the composition of the Marxian canon and in the interpretative tradition that now surrounds it. Analogous to Derrida, Carver made novel contributions to scholarship on Marx as a historical figure existing "in the plural" (p. 103). Key works in this field include Marx's Social Theory (1982); Marx and Engels: The Intellectual Relationship (1983); The Postmodern Marx (1999); and Engels: A Very Short Introduction (1981, repr. 2003). In addition, Carver has offered commentary on the presence of Marxisms in non-academic arenas, analysing Grimes' relationship with The Communist Manifesto, and the fictionalisations of Engels. Carver also served for a term on the Redaktionskommission for the Marx-Engels-Gesamtusgabe headquartered in Berlin where he figured in the controversies of the 1990s concerning Engels’s role as editor of the three volumes of Marx’s Das Kapital.

Carver has gained academic notoriety for his employment of feminist and men's studies perspectives on masculinities, contributing to political theory and International Relations. Most notably, his works in the field include Gender is not a Synonym for Women (1996), and Judith Butler and Political Theory: Troubling Politics (2008, co-authored with Samuel A. Chambers). Much of Carver’s theorisations on gender, sex and sexuality are influenced by the work of post-structural feminist thinkers, such as Judith Butler, Donna Haraway and Stevi Jackson. In navigating their discursive readings of gender, Carver critically analyses the masculinist, universalising narratives that construct and maintain the oppression of women. His 2022 book Masculinities, Gender and International Relations (co-authored with Laura Lyddon) turns this ‘gender lens’ onto the international politics of the legitimate arms trade and weapons manufacturing. In turn, Carver's contributions to gender, sex and sexuality studies have influenced notable feminist scholars, including Cynthia Enloe, Laura Shepherd, Catherine Eschle, and Sarah Childs.

Carver's research works have been translated into French, German, Spanish, Portuguese, Turkish, Arabic, Persian, Korean, Japanese, and Chinese.

Carver is the co-general editor of three-book series: 'Routledge Innovators in Political Theory' (with Samuel A. Chambers), 'Globalization' for Rowman & Littlefield (with Manfred B. Steger), and 'Marx, Engels, and Marxisms' for Palgrave Macmillan (with Marcello Musto). He has been co-editor-in-chief of the journal Contemporary Political Theory (with Samuel A. Chambers) since 2010.

Carver was a long-serving member of the executive committee of the Political Studies Association of the United Kingdom (PSA), during which time he created and managed an extensive program of exchange relationships with other national and international associations in political science. As a result, nearly 500 individuals received grants and aid, furthering the internationalisation of the profession and focusing on early career scholars and the Global South. He was also elected for two terms on the executive committee of the International Political Science Association (IPSA), serving as vice-president for Europe, and was appointed Program Co-chair for the World Congress in Brisbane in 2018. He was also President's special nominee on the governing Council in 2023. He has served as Consulting Editor for the journal Political Theory and is an active member of the editorial boards for New Political Science, International Feminist Journal of Politics and International Political Science Review.

== Awards and honours ==
In 2015, Carver was honoured, within the American Political Science Association, with the Charles A. McCoy Career Achievement Award, recognising him as a progressive political scientist who has had a long, successful career as an academic in teaching and service.

Carver has been a visiting professor or associated fellow at numerous academic institutions, including Pitzer College of the Claremont Colleges, Senshu University, Royal Melbourne Institute of Technology University, and Fudan University. He has taught regularly for the International Political Science Association ‘Methods School’ at the National University of Singapore. In addition, Carver has been appointed affiliated professor at the University of the Witwatersrand, Peking University, and Nanjing University.

== Marx, Engels and Marxisms ==
- Marx and Engels: The Intellectual Relationship (1983)

Carver navigates the complexity of the Marx-Engels relationship by disputing the three main biographical framings for it: that the two were always in agreement; that in considering Marx, Engels can be ignored; and that Marx, accepted all of Engels’s views. Contrary to this reception, Carver reveals how Marx can by no means be assumed to have shared Engels's views on natural and social history, or on dialectics as a scientific method.

- The Postmodern Marx (1999)

Carver makes sense of the tensions within Marxist thought over who Marx was and what he said, arguing that ‘there have always been multiple Marx’s, and each one is a product of a reading strategy’ (p. 234). According to Brown (1998), Carver offers a unique reading of Marx’s language and the language around Marx, from which 'Carver offers an alternative picture to readers as to who Marx is and why they might be interest in him' (p. 291). As a result, Carver offers a thematically and textually driven way to read Marx outside the conventional biographical and ideological framings.

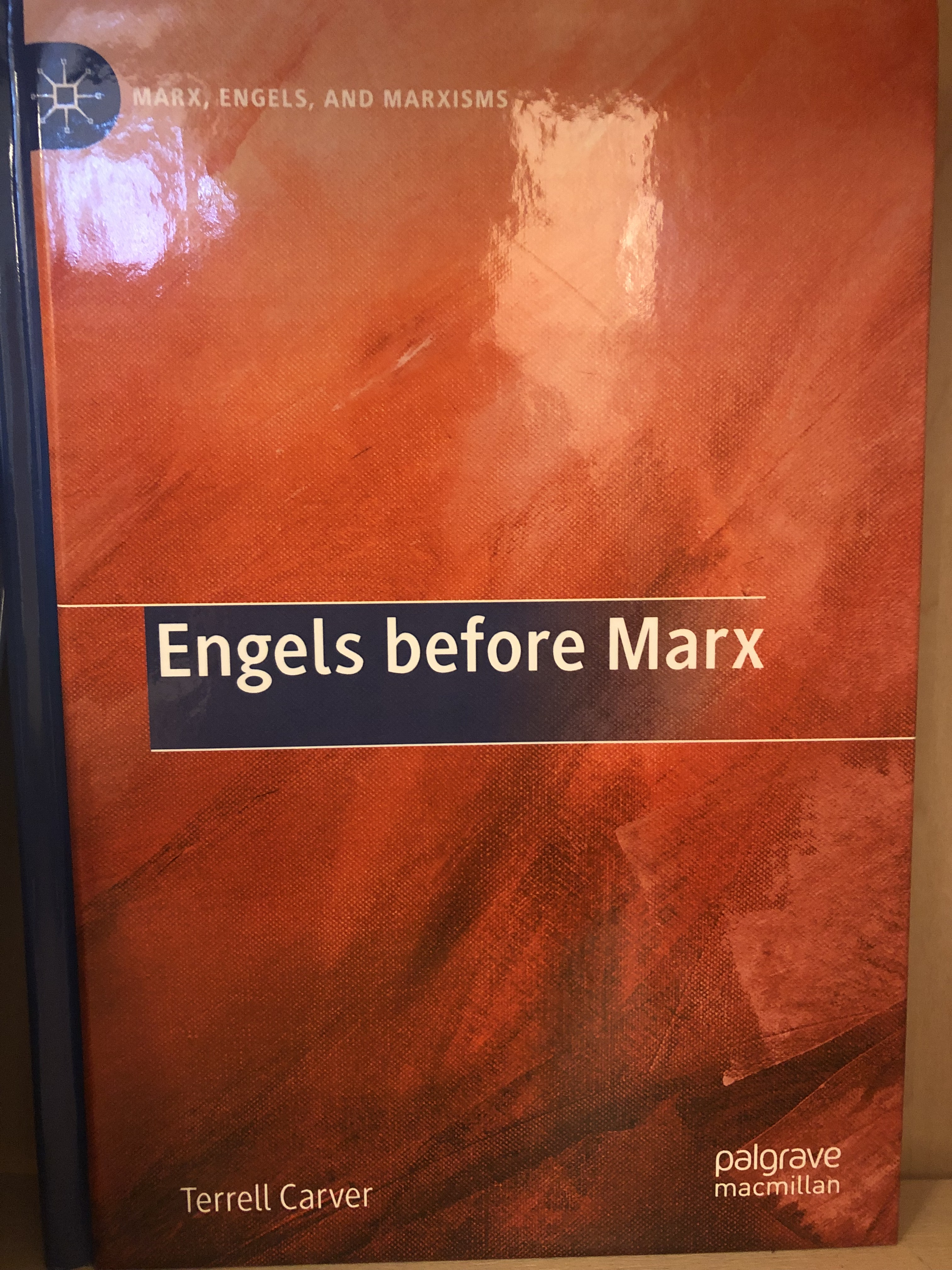

- Engels before Marx (2020)

Carver asks the reader to imagine Engels’s motivations and intent in his earliest works, long undervalued and dismissed as juvenilia, without teleological reference to his subsequent association with Marx. According to Strauss (2020), Carver does an 'immense service' (np) to the literature on Engels and Marx, revealing that the young Engels was ‘highly imaginative, projecting himself into other worlds via historical narrative and fictional writing, both prose and poetry’ (p. 7).

== Gender/sex/sexuality and feminist political thought ==
- Gender is not a Synonym for Women (1996)

Carver reprises and enhances the feminist critique of ‘masculine violence, domination, and privilege’ (p. 4), arguing that men, unlike women, can appear as universally ‘human’ in a supposedly de-gendered way, but also as gendered male and masculine in a moralising ‘good’ way. By turning to Engels's Origin of the Family, Private Property, and the State (1884), Carver demonstrates that as a proto-feminist Engels fails to examine men critically as ‘the agents of domination’ (p. 40), thereby reproducing the oppression of women. For this, Carver has received widespread notoriety for redressesing major erroneous assumptions within feminist thought that has led to an underdevelopment of the gendered perspective of men.

- Judith Butler and Political Theory: Troubling Politics (2008, co-authored with Samuel A. Chambers)

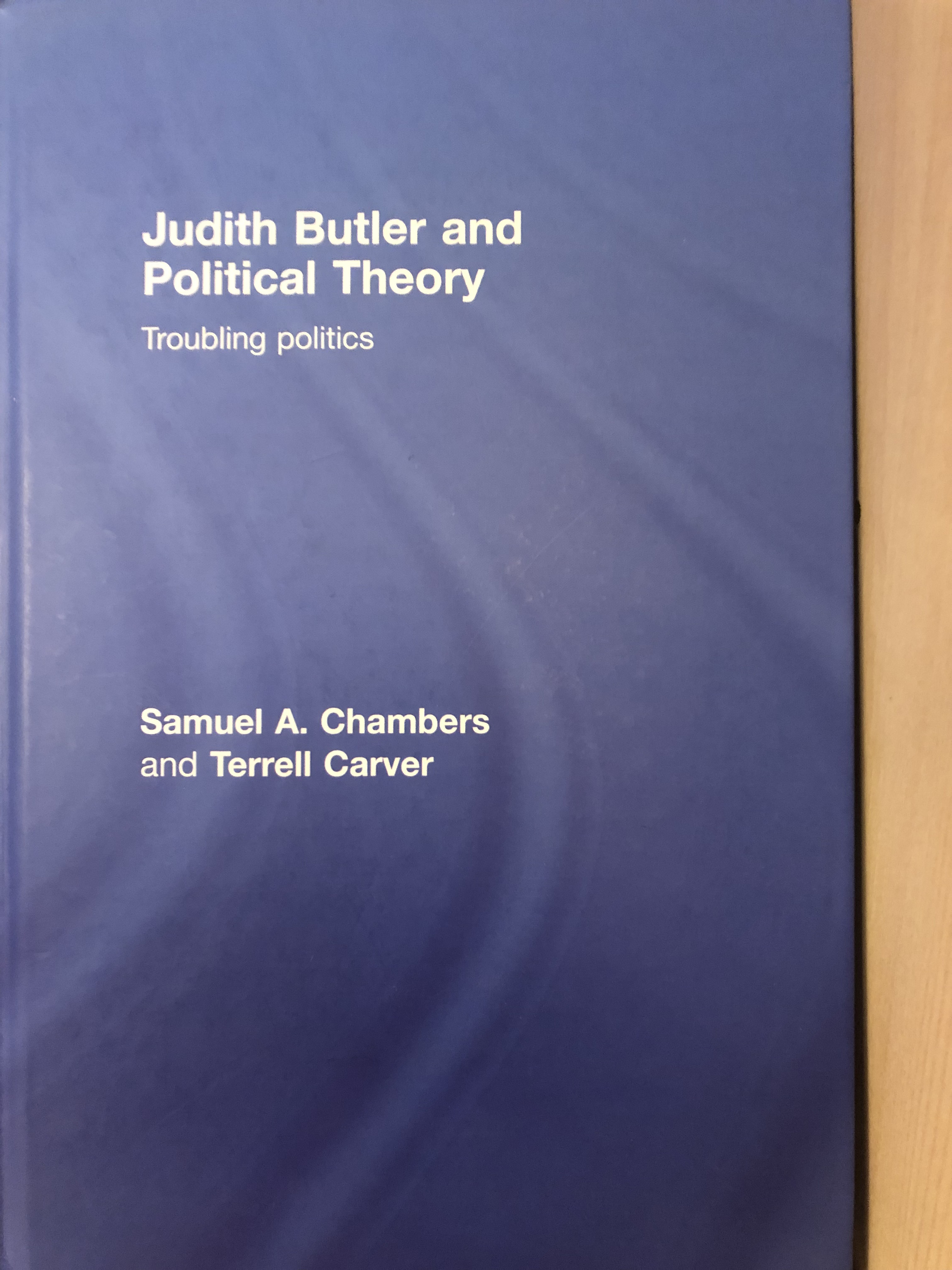

Carver and Chambers argue that the trope of ‘troubling’, from Butler's Gender Trouble (1990, repr. 1999), can serve as a guide to grasping Butler's theorisations of gender, sex and sexuality, and also as a guide to Butler's contributions to contemporary political theory. Carver and Chambers interrogate the ways that Butler makes philosophical trouble into political trouble, and what effects this troubling has had on feminist and queer politics, and on public policies. By bringing Butler into perspective as a political thinker, Carver and Chambers foreground Butler as a political theorist and show that Butler's work is central and canonical to political theory.

- Masculinities, Gender and International Relations (2022, co-authored with Laura Lyddon)

Carver and Lyddon conceptualise gender as a hierarchy of men over women, and of some men over others, the latter in ‘nested hierarchies’ of domination and subordination through which the oppression of women is secured. Thus, they align the global hierarchies of wealthy nation-states with the global hierarchies of military power, and with the global hierarchy of weapons production in national corporations – all of which are overwhelmingly male-dominated. Analytically they show how elite men are able to ‘get away with it’. As a result, this book has been noted as an 'insightful reflection on the relationship between gender, masculinities, and IR, both for IR scholars and international security practitioners' (Worth, 2022: p. 220).

== Books ==
- Karl Marx: Texts on Method (1975)
- The Logic of Marx (ed. and trans.) (1980)
- Engels (‘Past Masters’) (1981, repr. 1991) (Japanese trans. 1989; Korean trans. 2000; reissued as Engels: A Very Short Introduction, 2003)(Chinese trans. 2024)
- Marx’s Social Theory (1982)
- Marx and Engels: The Intellectual Relationship (1983) (Japanese trans. 1995; Chinese trans. 2016)
- Marx and Engels: A Conceptual Concordance (1983)
- A Marx Dictionary (1987)(Japanese trans. 1991)
- Marx’s ‘Grundrisse’ and Hegel’s ‘Logic’ (ed.) (1988 (German trans. 1994)
- Friedrich Engels: His Life and Thought (1989, repr. 1991);The Life and Thought of Friedrich Engels, 30th anniversary edn with a new intro. (2018)
- The Cambridge Companion to Marx (ed.) (1991)
- with Paul Thomas: Rational Choice Marxism: Assessments (ed.) (1995)
- Cambridge Texts in the History of Political Thought: Marx, Later Political Writings (ed. and trans.) (1996)
- Gender is not a Synonym for Woman (1996)
- Interpreting the Political: New Methodologies (ed. with Matti Hyvärinen) (1997)
- The Postmodern Marx (ed.) (1998)(Chinese trans. 2009)
- The Politics of Sexuality (ed. with Veronique Mottier) (1998)
- Engels After Marx (ed. with James Farr) (1999)
- Men in Political Theory (2004)
- Palgrave Advances in Continental Political Thought (ed. with James Martin) (2006)
- Judith Butler and Political Theory: Troubling Politics (with Samuel A. Chambers) (2008)
- Judith Butler's Precarious Politics: Critical Reflections (ed. with Samuel A. Chambers) (2008)
- Political Language and Metaphor: Interpreting and Changing the World (ed. with Jernej Pikalo) (2008)
- William E. Connolly: Democracy, Pluralism and Political Theory (ed. with Samuel A. Chambers) (2008)
- Globality, Democracy and Civil Society (ed. with Jens Bartelson) (2010)
- Carole Pateman: Feminism, Democracy, Welfare (ed.) (2011)
- Michael J. Shapiro: Discourse, Culture, Violence (ed.) (2012)
- A Political History of the Editions of Marx and Engels’s ‘German Ideology Manuscripts’ (ed. with Daniel Blank) (2014)
- Marx and Engels’s ‘German ideology’ Manuscripts: Presentation and Analysis of the ‘Feuerbach chapter’ (with Daniel Blank) (2014)
- The Cambridge Companion to the Communist Manifesto (ed. with James Farr) (2015)
- Histories of Violence (ed. with Brad Evans) (2017)
- Marx (2018) (Chinese trans. 2020)
- Engels Before Marx (2020)
- Friedrich Engels for the 21st Century (ed. with Smail Rapic) (2022)
- Masculinities, Gender and International Relations (with Laura Lyddon) (2022)

== Selected publications ==
- ‘“Public Man” and the Critique of Masculinity’, Political Theory, vol. 24, no. 4 (1996), pp. 673–86.
- ‘Kinship Trouble: Antigone’s Claim and the Politics of Heteronormativity’ (with S.A. Chambers), Politics & Gender, vol. 3, no. 4 (2007), pp. 427–49.
- ‘G.I. Jane: What are the Manners that Maketh a Man?’ British Journal of Politics & International Relations, vol. 9, no. 2 (2007), pp. 313–17.
- ‘Men in the Feminist Gaze: What does this mean in IR?’, Millennium, vol. 37, no. 1 (2008), pp. 107–22.
- ‘Whither Diversity?’ International Feminist Journal of Politics, vol. 11, no 1 (2009), pp. 30–4.
- ‘Sex, Gender and Heteronormativity: Reading “Some Like It Hot” as a Heterosexual Dystopia’, Contemporary Political Theory, vol. 8, no. 2 (2009), pp. 125–51.
- 'Cinematic Ontologies and Viewer Epistemologies: Knowing International Politics as Moving Images', Global Society, vol. 24, no. 3 (2010), pp. 421–31.
- ‘Militarized Masculinities and the Erasure of Violence’ (with Aaron Belkin), International Feminist Journal of Politics, vol. 14, no. 4 (2012), pp. 558–67.
- ‘Men and Masculinities in International Relations Research’, Brown Journal of World Affairs, vol. 21, no. 1 (2014), pp. 113–27.
- ‘Mere Auxiliaries to the Movement: How Intellectual Biography Obscures Marx’s and Engels’ Gendered Political Partnerships’, Hypatia, vol. 33, no. 4 (2018), pp. 593–609.
- ‘Whose Hand is the Last Hand? The New MEGA Edition of “The German Ideology”’, New Political Science, vol. 41, no. 1 (2019), pp. 140-148. (Chinese trans. 2024)
- ‘Engels Today: An Introduction’, International Critical Thought, vol. 10, no. 3 (2020), pp. 323–330.
- ‘The People’s Paving Stones: The Material Politics of International Human Rights in the Baldosas por la Memoria of Buenos Aires’ (with D. Amat and P. Ravecca), International Political Sociology, vol. 15, no. 3 (2021), pp. 378–96.
- ‘Through a Telescope Darkly: Marx and Slavery’, 19th Century Prose, vol. 49, no.1 (2022), pp. 141–158.
- ‘How (not) to Decolonize Marxism’ (with Gökbörü Sarp Tanyildiz), Emancipations, vol 3, no. 4 (2024), on-line.
