= Paul Thomas (Marx scholar) =

Marx scholar (1943–2016)

- Born: April 7, 1943; Chester, England
- Died: October 11, 2016 (aged 73); Oakland, California, U.S.
- Occupation: Professor
- Known for: Karl Marx and the Anarchists

David Paul Thomas (1943–2016) was a professor of political science at UC Berkeley and an author of several books on Karl Marx and Marxism.

== Selected works ==
- Karl Marx and the Anarchists (1980)
- Alien Politics: Marxist State Theory Retrieved (1994)
- Rational Choice Marxism (1995, with Terrell Carver)
- Culture and the State (1997, with David Lloyd)
- Marxism and Scientific Socialism from Engels to Althusser (2008)
- Karl Marx: Critical Lives (2013)
