= Encyclopedia of New Jersey =

The Encyclopedia of New Jersey

The Encyclopedia of New Jersey is edited by Maxine N. Lurie and Marc Mappen and contains around 3,000 original articles, along with 585 illustrations and 130 maps. It was published in 2004 by Rutgers University Press, with ISBN 0-8135-3325-2. The publication was overseen by an editorial board of experts in a variety of fields and edited by specialists in New Jersey history. It is the most definitive reference work ever published on the state.

== See also ==
- Women's Project of New Jersey
