= Association for Asian American Studies =

Research organization

- Abbreviation: AAAS
- Formation: 1979; 47 years ago
- Type: 501(c)(3) organization
- Tax ID no.: 16-1456606
- President: Martin Manalansan
- Website: www.aaastudies.org

The Association for Asian American Studies (AAAS) is a professional organization promoting teaching and research in Asian American studies. Its other goals including advocacy and representation on behalf of Asian-Americans and educating American society about the history of Asian American communities.

The AAAS includes within Asian-American studies the following "sub-components": "Chinese, Japanese, Korean, Filipino, Hawai’ian, Southeast Asian, South Asian, Pacific Islander, and other groups."

AAAS was founded in 1979 as the Association for Asian/Pacific American Studies. The name was changed in 1982.

== Activities ==
AAAS holds an annual academic conference dedicated to research in Asian American Studies.

Members can join various sections dedicated to subfields such as History, Critical Adoption Studies, and Queer Studies.

The Association publishes the Journal of Asian American Studies.

== Boycott of Israeli universities ==
The general membership of the association unanimously approved, at its annual meeting held on April 20, 2013, a resolution endorsing the boycott of Israeli universities. The resolution linked the association's Israel boycott to one of the AAAS's aims, which is to "advance a critique of U.S. empire." AAAS president Mary Yu Danico stated that the AAAS will "discourage partnerships with Israeli academic institutions, whether they’re curriculum partnerships or study abroad partnerships, because that would be becoming complicit with the discriminatory practices of Israeli institutions, and we would be encouraging faculty, staff and students to forge alliances with Palestinian faculty and Palestinian students who now have so much difficulty engaging in conversations with scholars from the rest of the world." However, Danico also stressed that the boycott will only target institutions, not individual Israeli academics.

In justifying the boycott, the resolution stated that Israeli academic institutions not only failed to oppose “the occupation and racial discrimination against Palestinians in Israel” but also charged that they are “directly and indirectly complicit in the systematic maintenance of the occupation and of policies and practices that discriminate against Palestinian students and scholars throughout Palestine and in Israel.” The resolution also claimed that Israeli academic institutions are "deeply complicit in Israel’s violations of international law and human rights and in its denial of the right to education and academic freedom to Palestinians."

The AAAS has also expressed its opposition to the “US military occupation in the Arab world and US support for occupation and racist practices by the Israeli state."

In passing the resolution, the AAAS became the first U.S. scholarly organization to boycott Israel." The US Campaign for the Academic and Cultural Boycott of Israel celebrated the resolution as “historic” and promoting it as “is the FIRST [sic] academic organization in the U.S. to boycott Israeli institutions.” It was joined in December 2013 by the American Studies Association (ASA).

The boycott was criticized by Zionist activist groups Scholars for Peace in the Middle East, and the Anti-Defamation League.
