= Association des Travailleurs Grecs du Québec =

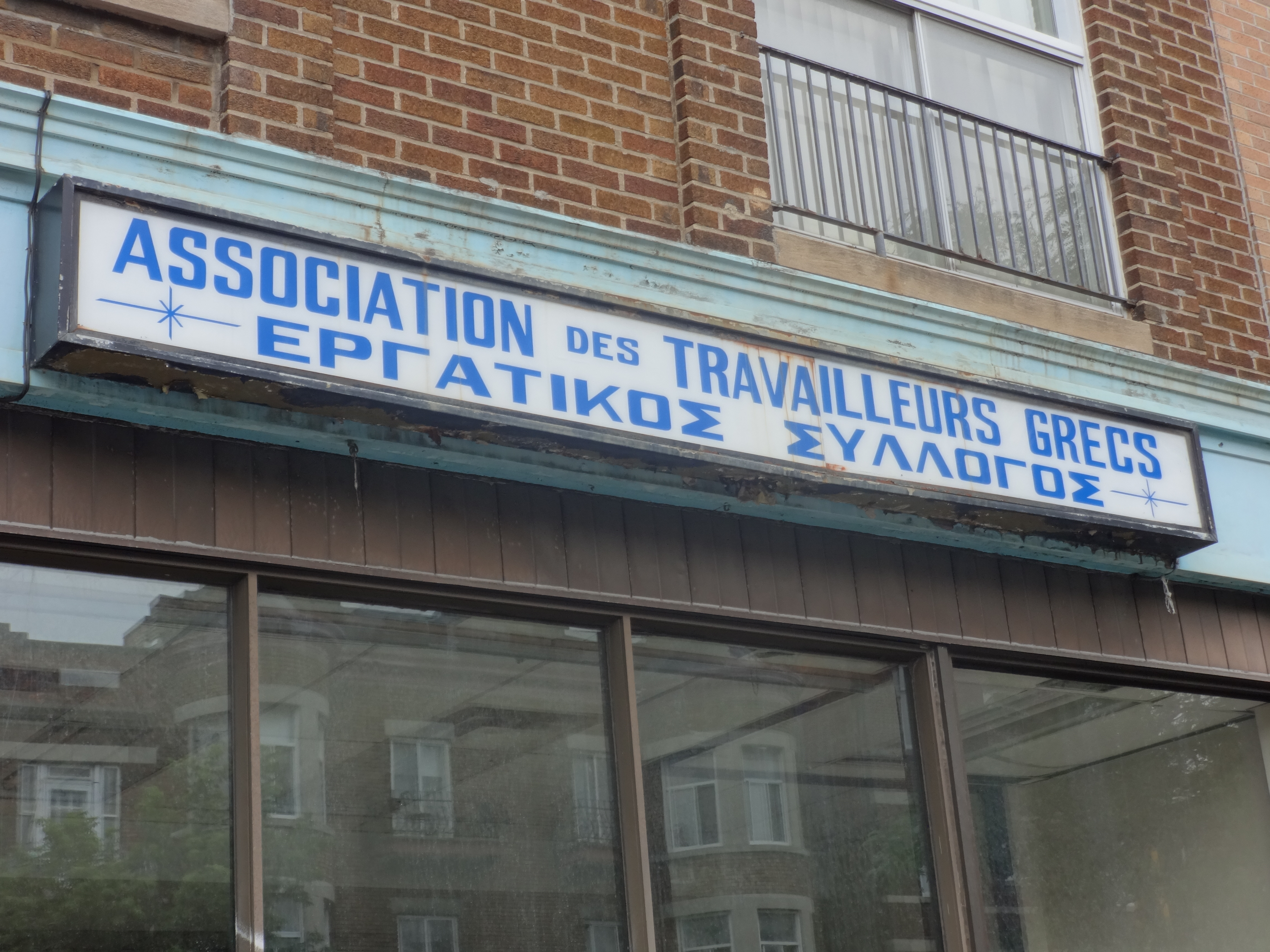
Association of the Greek Workers of Quebec, July 2017.

The Association des Travailleurs Grecs du Québec (ATGQ) (English: Greek Workers's Association of Quebec) is an association in Montreal, Quebec, that represents the city's working-class Greek immigrant community.

== History ==
The association was founded on March 3, 1971, by progressive members of the Greek diaspora, in opposition to the official diaspora organizations that were at the time aligned with the military regime ruling Greece. Its first offices were at the Montreal YMCA on 5550 Avenue du Parc. It has been housed in its current location since 1979.

The association is broadly supportive of various progressive, labour, and anti-imperialist causes, such as Palestinian solidarity, Cuban solidarity, opposition to war, opposition to mining, and the movement to increase the minimum wage.

== See also ==
- Greek Canadians
