= List of opponents of the BDS movement =

The list of people who oppose the BDS movement includes those who have either voiced opposition to the BDS movement, accused it of antisemitism, or spoken out against comprehensive boycotts against Israel. It does not include people who have been unwilling to commit to a boycott of Israel, only those actively opposing it.

Name	Occupation	Country	Year	Source
Brian A. Cunningham	Politician	United States	2022	
Nas Daily (Nuseir Yassin)	YouTuber	Israel		
Robert Kraft	Owner of New England Patriots	United States		
Joe Biden	President	United States	2020	
Helen Mirren	Actor	England, UK	2016	
Arthur Orr	Politician	United States	2016	
Boris Johnson	Prime Minister	England, UK	2019	
Barack Obama	President	United States	2012	
Theresa May	Prime Minister	United Kingdom	2018	
Aziz Maraka	Singer	Jordan	2020	
Sari Nusseibeh	Professor of Philosophy	Palestine	2014	
Arsen Ostrovsky	Hasbarist, lawyer, and head of AIJAC Sydney office	Israel (Note: born in the Ukrainian Soviet Socialist Republic and currently based in Sydney, Australia.)		
Reuven Rivlin	President	Israel	2016	
José María Aznar	Prime Minister	Spain	2015	
Jan Bartošek	Politician	Czech Republic	2019	
David Cameron	Prime Minister	United Kingdom	2014	
Gilad Erdan	Strategic Affairs Minister	Israel		
Steve McCabe	Member of Parliament	United Kingdom	2021	
Israel Katz	Intelligence Minister	Israel		
Rachel Riley	Television presenter and mathematician	United Kingdom		
Sharon Osbourne	Television personality	United Kingdom		
Thom Yorke	Singer	United Kingdom	2017	
Abraham Foxman	Lawyer	United States	2013	
Ritchie Torres	Politician	United States	2020	
Adam Milstein	Real-estate investor, lobbyist and philanthropist	United States	2016	
Yishai Fleisher	Settler and spokesperson	Israel		
Hillary Clinton	Politician	United States	2015	
Justin Trudeau	Prime Minister	Canada	2019	
Alan Dershowitz	Lawyer	United States	2013	
Cary Nelson	English professor	United States	2018	
Deborah Lipstadt	Holocaust historian	United States	2019	
Judea Pearl	Academic	United States	2018	
Mordechai Kedar	Politician	Israel		
Ed Asner	Actor	United States	2017	
Stephen Fry	Actor	United Kingdom	2019	
Yossi Beilin	Politician and scholar	Israel		
J. K. Rowling	Writer	United Kingdom		
Charles Krauthammer	Pundit	United States	2014	
Lisa Nandy	Politician	United Kingdom	2021	
Nick Cave	Singer and author	Australia	2017	
John Lydon	Singer	United Kingdom	2010	
Gene Simmons	Musician	United States	2011	
Paul McCartney	Singer and musician	United Kingdom	2008	
John Lewis	Politician and civil rights leader	United States	2019	
Jamaal Bowman	Politician	United States	2021	
John Fetterman	Politician	United States	2023	
Eric Adams	Politician	United States	2022	

== See also ==
- BDS movement
- List of supporters of the BDS movement
