= Women's Project of New Jersey =

Women's History nonprofit organization

The Women’s Project of New Jersey was initiated in October 1984 to publish the first comprehensive reference volume on women who were both representative and notable in New Jersey’s history. Its mission expanded to promote the understanding of “the role of women in the history and culture of our state." The original goal was achieved in April 1990 with the publication of the award-winning volume Past and Promise: Lives of New Jersey Women. The organization’s broader goal was and continues to be achieved by the creation of a traveling photographic exhibit, a speakers’ panel and lecture series, two school workbooks and K-12 curricula found on the NJ women’s history website, a speakers’ bureau, a poster series, a paperback revised and updated edition of Past and Promise, and the development of the nation’s first state-based women’s history website.

== History ==
Beginning with the support of the Mendham [NJ] Free Public Library, the Project’s growing research, production and publication activities resulted in the incorporation of the Women’s Project of New Jersey as an independent non-profit in July 1985 with a volunteer Board of Trustees that included historians, librarians, writers, a lawyer, an accountant, a publicist, an educational equity specialist, women's studies specialists, and an art historian. Academics from Rutgers University, New Jersey City University and Drew University were particularly active on the collaborative project.

Initial steps included defining the focus and scope of the Project, determining the research methods and how to ensure accuracy, establishing the editorial board, targeting the audience to be as wide as possible, deciding how to organize the volume, discussing funding sources and potential publishers, and identifying subjects for the biographical volume that promoted an understanding of the role of women in the history and culture of New Jersey. The selection of "representative" women of all backgrounds as well as "notable" women was determined, reflecting the diversity and value of the lives of the women of the State, and adopting an inclusive view of history that understands the past as the history of all the people, not merely the history of those who held a monopoly of power.

The task of the editors was to determine “not only who was significant, but also what was significant”, including the value of women’s unpaid family and community-building work.

The search for suitable subjects included scouring major historic reference sources, writing to all of the state’s 463 historic societies, and contacting major women’s organizations. In order to help ensure an appropriate historic perspective, it was decided that potential subjects for the biographical volume had to have been born in or before 1923, the date of the introduction of the Equal Rights Amendment, written by New Jerseyan Alice Paul. Out of 1,000 potential subjects, 296 were chosen, illustrating women’s private and public sphere of achievement. Special efforts were taken to seek out under-represented sub-populations of women.

More than 250 researcher/writers were recruited and trained to complete the extensive research of original documents required as the foundation for writing each biographical entry. They contacted the living subjects, some of whom were interviewed, and asked all to review their biographies before publication. Several instances of published historic error were uncovered and rectified. Several artifacts and rare photographs, long neglected or lost, were uncovered and given their rightful place in the history of the state. Bibliographic entries at the end of each article and a comprehensive Index provided scholars and general readers with additional tools to expand their understanding of the women examined in the reference volume. An introduction and overview essays for each of the four defined historic periods provided context and unifying narrative. It was decided not to use the traditional historical periodizations, based on wars, but rather to create new ones based on women’s lived lives.

State-based private foundations, state and federal agencies, and corporations provided the majority of the funding for the writers/researchers' honoraria, administrative costs, and special projects. Fundraising events were also carried out.

The quality of this historic undertaking was recognized by the award of the American Association for State and Local History (AASLH) to the WPNJ of its Certificate of Commendation in 1986 for the "Women's History Through Biography" project. In 1990 and 1991 respectively, the WPNJ was honored with awards from the New Jersey Historical Commission and the national AASLH for the book, traveling photographic exhibition, and establishment of the Women’s History Archives at Rutgers University Libraries, all deemed contributions to the advancement of state and local history. In 2004 the AASLH again awarded the WPNJ a Certificate of Commendation in recognition of the New Jersey Women’s History Website, created in collaboration with Rutgers University and the New Jersey Historical Society, which has served as a model for other state-based women’s history websites across the nation.

Upon its publication, the significance of the volume in researching, recording and interpreting for a wide public audience the experiences and achievements of half of the population which had been largely ignored by traditional scholarship was recognized by the widespread review and praise of the volume by The New York Times, the Star-Ledger, the New Jersey Historical Commission Newsletter, New Directions for Women, NJ History, and numerous other regional newspapers and scholarly journals.

The impact of the original WPNJ initiative has multiplied over the years as various publications by Project scholars, the creation of a Speakers Bureau to provide knowledgeable presenters to schools and communities, the creation of a “New Jersey Women’s Heritage Trail,” initiatives such as the “New Jersey Women’s History Web Site Training Project” – which trained teachers to demonstrate how to integrate New Jersey women’s history into K-12 curricula using Internet documentary sources – biographical entries in The Encyclopedia of New Jersey, and other initiatives have continued to use WPNJ scholarship to expand the understanding and appreciation of the role of women in the history and culture of the state.

The Board of Trustees of the Women’s Project of New Jersey, Inc. dissolved the organization on 4 November 2006.

== Projects ==
The collected research which resulted in the publication of the Past and Promise reference volume inspired the creation of other products to disseminate the stories and issues embodied in the lives of New Jersey women to an even wider audience than the reference volume alone could reach.

=== Reference Volume ===
Past and Promise: Lives of New Jersey Women, the first comprehensive reference volume (486 pages) covering the lives of 296 notable and representative New Jersey women over 4 centuries, was published in 1990 by Scarecrow Press, Metuchen, NJ. The 1997 paperback revised and updated edition was published by Syracuse University Press. The Foreword was written by Gayle Samuels, President of the WPNJ Board of Trustees. The Introduction was written by Suzanne Lebsock. The Historical Overviews for the four sections of the volume were written by Carmela Ascolese Karnoutsos (1600-1807), Carolyn DeSwarte Gifford (1808-1865), Delight Wing Dodyk (1866-1920), and Joan N. Burstyn (1921–present). The Managing Editors were Gayle Samuels and Caroline Wheeler Jacobus. The WPNJ and Past and Promise: Lives of New Jersey Women are cited either bibliographically or as a “Further reading” resource in numerous Wikipedia articles such as History of slavery in New Jersey, Temperance movement in the United States, Women in Archaeology, the Denishawn School, and the Wikipedia articles on Union Township, Union County, New Jersey and Vauxhall, New Jersey, as well as in many of the articles on specific women subjects in Wikipedia articles, of which a selection of bibliographic subjects from among the volume's 296 subjects is listed below.

=== Traveling Photographic Exhibit ===
A traveling photographic exhibit based upon the photographs and research materials collected for the reference volume traveled throughout the state to colleges and universities, schools, museums, libraries, corporations, and conferences from 1990 to 1994. It presented five themes: law and politics; the economy (agriculture, business, and industry); community life; arts and letters; sports and physical fitness. The curators of the traveling photographic exhibit were Doris Friedensohn, Ferris Olin, and Barbara Rubin.

=== Elementary and Secondary School Curriculum ===
Three of the WPNJ (Women's Project of New Jersey) essay writers: Arlene Ferman, Helen Svihra, and Grace A. Aqualina created a workbook for students at the upper elementary level entitled Better Than Our Best: Women of Valor in American History which was published in 1991. Subsequently, the Women's Project of New Jersey sponsored a 1993 publication designed for secondary school usage on women's suffrage in New Jersey, Reclaiming Lost Ground: the Struggle for Woman Suffrage in New Jersey by Neale McGoldrick and Margaret Crocco. This volume is filled with archival documents, images, and narratives.

=== WPNJ Archive ===
In 1990, the WPNJ arranged with the Special Collections of the Rutgers University Libraries to inventory and house the organizational and research archives of the WPNJ project. The archives and its finding aid, entitled “Inventory to the Records of the Women's Project of New Jersey, 1984-2004 (Collection No. MC 833),” are now deposited with Special Collections/University Archives at Alexander Library, Rutgers University, New Brunswick. The Records of the Women's Project of New Jersey document the work undertaken by some 300 volunteers to produce Past and Promise: Lives of New Jersey Women. The papers also provide details of the Project's other endeavors to promote understanding of the roles of women in the history of New Jersey, as well as a wealth of primary and secondary sources on notable and representative women in New Jersey’s history.

=== Women’s Biography Lecture, Film, and Panel Series ===
In 1985-1986, WPNJ collaborated with the Women's Studies program and Wendy Kolmar, Drew University, on a lecture series entitled "Women's History Through Biography." Nationally recognized scholars, among whom were Lois Banner, Blanche Wiesen Cook, Nancy F. Cott, and Darlene Clark Hine, presented lectures to promote the study of women's history followed by workshops and a documentary film series.

=== Women’s History Website ===
The “New Jersey Women’s History” website, an Internet project based on Past and Promise: Lives of New Jersey Women, was the first state-based on-line women’s history website in the nation and the first electronic resource for New Jersey women’s history. It has been active since 1997. The American Association for State and Local History (AASLH) again awarded the WPNJ a Certificate of Commendation in 2004 for the website. During the time the WPNJ administered the website it was the only such state women's history website in the country.

== Follow-on Projects ==
=== Women’s History Initiative ===
In 2002, based on the 1990 WPNJ publication Past and Promise: Lives of New Jersey Women, the WPNJ worked with the Historic Preservation Office of the NJ Department of Environmental Protection and the Alice Paul Institute to identify and create a survey of underrepresented historic sites and resources associated with the lives of both extraordinary and representative women of New Jersey, including a cultural and historical context study of how New Jersey women’s history related to United States history. This work constituted the foundational components of the NJDEP’s Women’s History Initiative. They were used to create the DEP's New Jersey Women's Heritage Trail guidebook, New Jersey Women's Trail.

=== Preservation Partners ===
Also based on the 1990 WPNJ publication Past and Promise: Lives of New Jersey Women, Preservation Partners published its own book, Women's Place in New Jersey History, in 2004.

=== The Encyclopedia of New Jersey ===
WPNJ President Delight Dodyk served on the advisory board of The Encyclopedia of New Jersey (2004) and helped select subjects from Past and Promise for inclusion in the encyclopedia. Sixty-five entries from the Women’s Project of New Jersey volume were adopted into The Encyclopedia of New Jersey, with attribution to the WPNJ and to Past and Promise (1997).
