= Yoav Litvin =

American writer, scientist and photographer (born 1976)

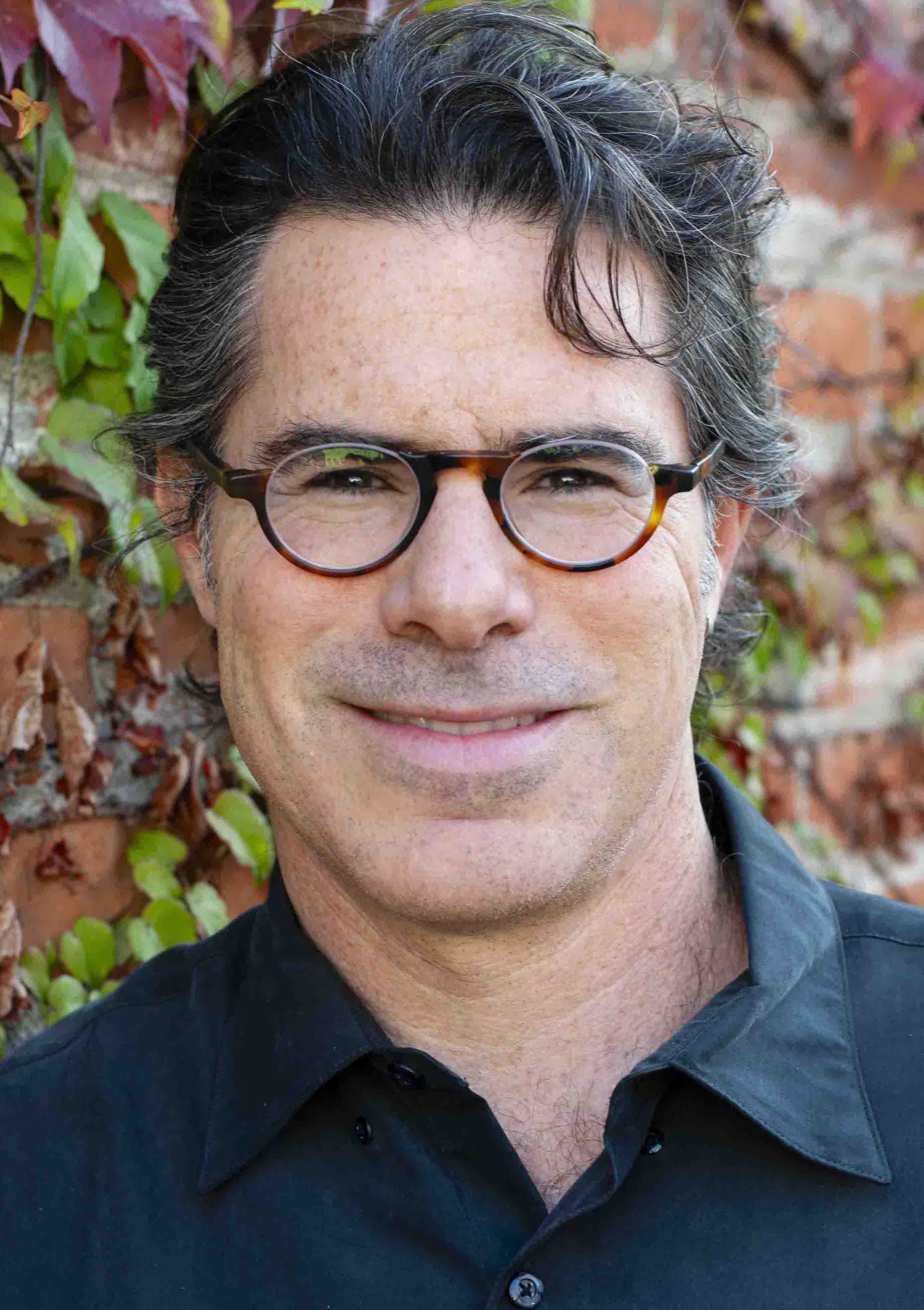
- Litvin in 2025
- Born: Yoav Litvin; August 31, 1976 (age 50); Jerusalem, Israel
- Education: University of Hawaiʻi at Mānoa
- Scientific career
- Fields: Behavioral neuroscience, Photography, Politics
- Workplaces: University of Hawaiʻi at Mānoa; Rockefeller University
- Website: yoavlitvin.com

Yoav Litvin (born August 31, 1976) is a writer, scientist and photographer whose work integrates political, cultural and scientific themes.

Following his academic career in the field of Psychology / Neuroscience, Litvin applies behavioral and cognitive perspectives to the study of social conflict, war and aggressive behavior. Litvin views Zionism as a political ideology and settler-colonial project, situating Israel–Palestine within broader discussions of empire, capitalism and U.S. foreign policy. Drawing on behavioral science, political theory and cultural analysis, he has written on propaganda and mechanisms of social control, as well as forms of resistance and solidarity. His photographic work focuses on political movements, street art and graffiti.

== Early life and education ==
Litvin was born in Jerusalem, Israel, the youngest of three, to a family of Ashkenazi Jews. His mother Ilana and father Yair were both born in Israel. His maternal grandparents – Judith and Marcus Bezner – were German and Polish Jews, respectively, who fled Nazi persecution in the 1930s, while his paternal grandparents – Tova and Volodya Litvin – were Russian Jews who immigrated to Palestine in the early 20th century.

Litvin attended elementary school in New York City (grades 1–6) while his father completed a medical internship in endocrinology at the Albert Einstein College of Medicine in the Bronx and his mother participated in an accredited psychology internship program at the same college. They returned to Israel, where Litvin completed junior high and high school. In 1994, at the age of 18, he was drafted into the Israel Defense Forces (IDF) where he served until 1997 as a medic in the paratroopers.

Litvin graduated from Tel Aviv University in 2004 with a BSc degree in biology with a minor in Far Eastern Studies.

== Behavioral neuroscience ==
During his BSc studies, Litvin met Professors Robert and Caroline Blanchard, advocates of ethoexperimental approaches to the study of behaviour, while they were conducting research at the Tel Aviv University Zoo. They invited him to join their laboratory as a graduate student. He relocated to Honolulu, Hawaiʻi, to study Behavioral neuroscience at the University of Hawaiʻi at Mānoa, which he completed with a PhD thesis Maternal separation modulates short-term behavioral and physiological indices of the stress response in 2008 under their supervision.

Litvin conducted postdoctoral studies in Neuroendocrinology and the Neurobiology of Stress at The Rockefeller University in New York City under the supervision of Professor Donald W. Pfaff (2008-2011) and Professor Bruce McEwen (2011-2014).

Litvin’s scientific interests and expertise focused on the study of the neuroendocrine indices of emotion, particularly fear, anxiety, stress, social behavior, and their associated pathologies.

== Photography ==
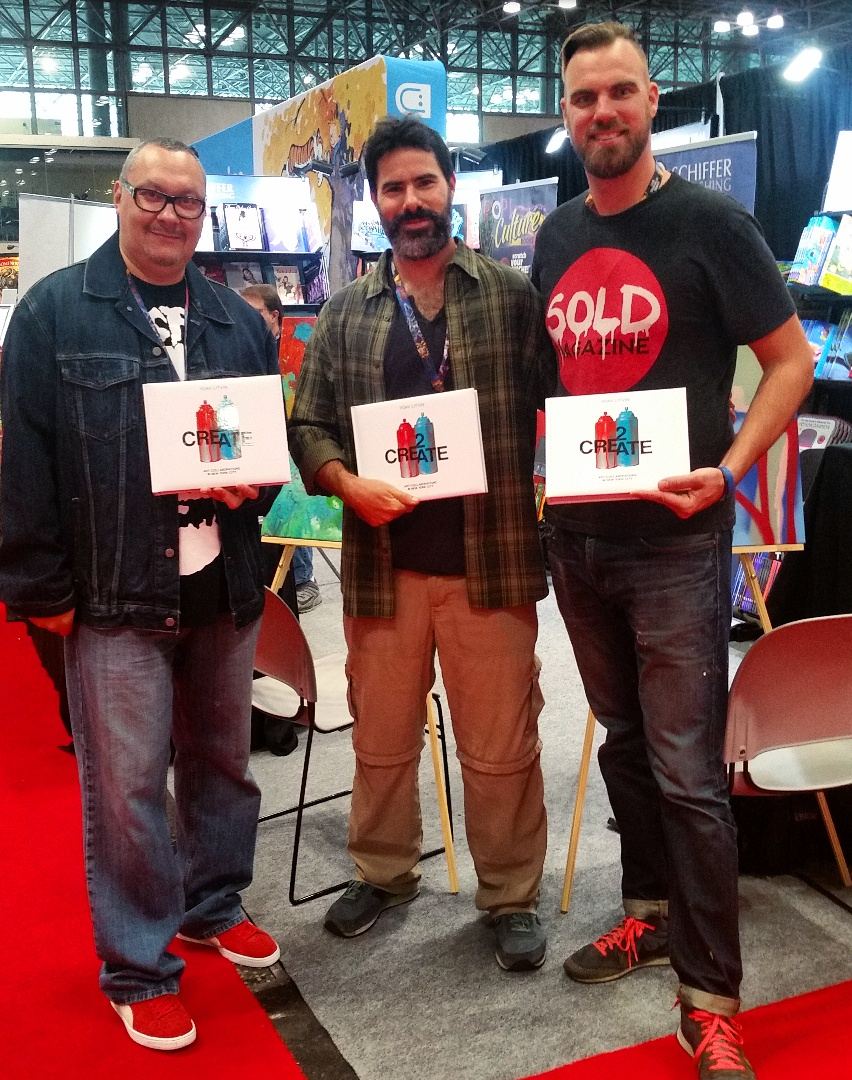
At Comicon 2016 in NYC

After completing his doctorate Litvin moved to New York, where he did postdoctoral work at Rockefeller University, conducted research and taught. However, in March 2012, a sports accident marked a turning point in his career. While at the gym, his squash partner accidentally struck him in the face with his racket with full force. The result was a severe spinal injury that left him disabled; his recovery was very slow, all sports were out. The best activity he could manage was walking. On weekends, when he wasn't working, he began walking for 5 to 8 hours a day. During these walks through Brooklyn and Queens, he began photographing street art and posting it on Instagram. In what originated as simple tags and usually treated as vandalism, and what over time developed into elaborate images he started to acknowledge pieces of true art. From people who liked the photos and recognized the artists, he learned who the creators were. He started attending exhibition openings and making personal connections. Soon he began documenting graffiti and street art in New York City, chronicling a radical and ephemeral movement. His first book, Outdoor Gallery – New York City (Gingko Press, 2014), profiles 46 artists and includes in-depth interviews exploring their life histories, inspirations, creative processes and visions for the future. It documents the diverse contemporary street art environment of New York City. The book predominantly collects the work of New York based artists, from old school graffiti writers such as Cope2, to contemporary street artists such as Hellbent, EKG, ASVP, Cern and Gaia. Their work is showcased alongside that of several international fellow travelers such as Nick Walker, The Yok, Sheryo and KRAM. The book won the Independent Publisher Book Award in 2016, in the category US Northeast – Best Regional Non-Fiction.

In his second book 2Create: Art Collaborations in New York City (Schiffer Books, 2016), Litvin interrogates the collaborative process by focusing on its basic structure – the duo. The book depicts the work of nine pairs of graffiti and street artists, with their backgrounds, techniques and collaborative processes. Interviews and action photography explain the relationships formed between individuals from diverse backgrounds and creative upbringings that follows the artistic process from creation to collaborative artwork. The connection of art and politics is also covered, as the gentrification and commodification of New York City produced the gentrification and commodification of its graffiti and street art. In the book Litvin has also documented street art and graffiti in Cuba and across South America, including Colombia, Ecuador, Bolivia, Peru, Chile and Brazil.

Litvin’s engagement with the arts, particularly grassroots street art and graffiti, serves as both documentation and theory. He treats radical art as a form of counter-culture and story-telling: a decentralized, radical and ephemeral practice that resists commodification and disrupts dominant narratives, including within the art world and publishing industry. For Litvin, art is not ancillary to politics but a site where suppressed histories, collective trauma and visions of liberation are expressed and contested.

In the photo Litvin is depicted with two street art authors, Luis "Zimad" Lamboy (left) and John Paul O'Grodnick (JPO, right) at the Comic book convention in New York.

== Political analysis ==
As Litvin spent substantial amount of time outside his basic vocation, science and academia, got involved with arts and politics, it became clear to him that his current job and the new fields of interests are mutually exclusive. Academia required him to focus solely on science, and he was not willing to do so any more. In turn, he knew that he could not be competitive versus those who devote themselves completely to academia. Academia would also limit the freedom of expression of his political ideas. In 2014 he quit his job at the Rockefeller University and became a freelance writer in the sciences, working at different medical and science companies. From 2012 he was engaged in art photography and from 2015 he also published in the field of political analysis, in the US and abroad.

Litvin’s political analysis centers on the argument that modern systems of domination, particularly Zionism, U.S. imperialism and racial capitalism, are sustained through a combination of military and economic power, and cultural/ psychological control. Drawing on his training in psychology and neuroscience, Litvin examines how oppression operates at the level of behavior, cognition and emotion, dehumanizing both the oppressor and oppressed, in line with revolutionary, anti-colonial philosophers such as Frantz Fanon and Paulo Freire.

A core theme of his work is the role of propaganda and identity in the formation of a culture that normalizes violence. Litvin analyzes how liberal institutions and curated media narratives sanitize state violence while pathologizing resistance, allowing societies to participate in or tolerate atrocities without confronting their ethical implications. He situates Israel–Palestine within a broader global framework of settler colonialism and empire, arguing that Israel functions as an intensified expression of Western imperial, white supremacist logics. Litvin was one of the first analysts to recognize the genocidal trajectory of the Israeli government leading to October 7th, 2023, and outlined the psychological underpinnings of Israel’s actions post-October 7. He is an anti-Zionist activist and supports the Boycott, Divestment and Sanctions movement.

In a series of interviews inspired by the murder of George Floyd in 2020, Litvin interrogates the Black Panther Party as an example of an anti-colonial organization within the American imperial core, representing the vanguard of a liberation movement that confronted racial capitalism through political education, community survival programs and armed self-defense. He emphasizes that the Panthers understood oppression as operating not only through state violence and economic deprivation, but through psychological control and internalized fear.

Litvin argues that an intersectional, revolutionary and abolitionist approach based on bottom-up horizontally organized power structures is essential for confronting the ills of capitalism, including global warfare and climate collapse, and building a sustainable, equitable society grounded in peace and justice.

Litvin's attitude to one of the main issues of modern time can best be seen in his article, published in January 2026:

By contrast, liberation and reconciliation and an end to capitalist oppression, with its accompanying genocidal violence and planetary destruction, require a steadfast structural framework aligned with broader leftist, antiracist and anti-colonial principles. Such a framework prioritises systemic transformation over spectacle.

In 2026 Litvin and Ilan Pappé, historian and political scientist, coauthored the book Wired to Steal: Zionism and the Shaping of the Western Mind. Together with the foreword by neurobiologist Robert Sapolsky the book argues that Zionism stands on violence and dispossession, and critically analyzes Israel's actions in Gaza, through the optics of colonial exploitation and Schadenfreude.

== Personal life ==
Litvin is married and has two children, a son and a daughter. In 2016 the family moved from New York to Bellingham, WA.
