= George Bisharat =

American academic

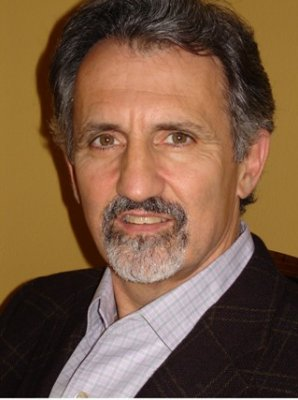
George Bisharat, 2010

George Bisharat (born 1954) is an American professor of law and frequent commentator on current events in the Middle East, and the Israeli–Palestinian conflict in particular.

== Life ==
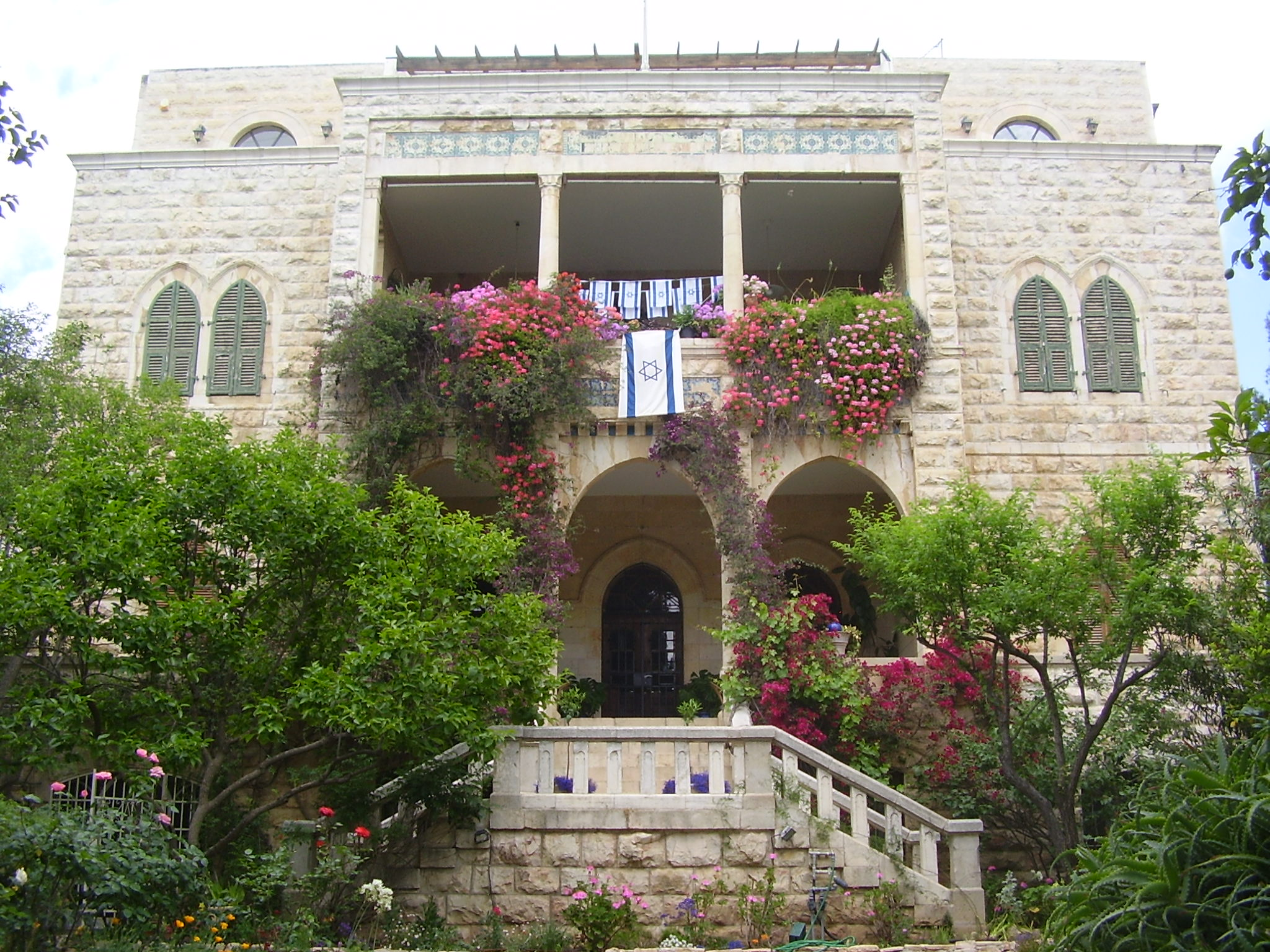
Villa Harun Al Rashid, in Talbiya, built by Bisharat's paternal grandfather in 1926, confiscated by the Israelis after 1948, and becoming Golda Meir's residence in the 1960s.

Bisharat was born in Topeka, Kansas to a Palestinian father, Dr. Maurice Bisharat from Talbiya, Jerusalem (whose Palestinian Christian family originally came from Rafidia) and an American mother Mary Johnson. A house owned and built in 1926 by Bisharat's paternal grandfather Hanna Ibrahim Bisharat was later confiscated by Zionist militias and became the residence of Golda Meir. Bisharat's paternal uncle Victor was a prominent architect who helped revitalize Stamford, Connecticut. He earned his B.A. in anthropology from UC-Berkeley in California and his M.A. in history from Georgetown University in Washington, DC, before going on to graduate cum laude from Harvard Law School. In 1987, he earned a PhD in Anthropology and Middle East Studies from Harvard University.

Bisharat served as deputy Public Defender for the city of San Francisco from 1987 to 1991, and in 1989, he published the book Palestinian Lawyers and Israeli Rule: Law and Disorder in the West Bank (University of Texas Press). In 1991, Bisharat became Professor of Law at the University of California's Hastings College of the Law in San Francisco, California, a position he continues to hold. He has also worked with the Palestinian Legislative Council on efforts to reform and develop the Palestinian judiciary system, and is a former member of the editorial board of the Journal of Palestine Studies.

== Views ==
Bisharat is a commentator on the Middle East and the legal and human rights aspects of the Israeli-Palestinian conflict, and his written commentaries have been published in U.S. and international media. He was a critic of Israel's conduct during its 2006 war with Lebanon, and has been a defender of the right of return of Palestinian refugees who were expelled or fled from their homes in 1948 during the creation of the State of Israel.

Bisharat supports the possibility of a one-state solution to the Israeli–Palestinian conflict, and is working on a book addressing the legal aspects of that solution. He supports a boycott of Israel, arguing in a 2007 editorial published by the San Francisco Chronicle that a boycott was "both necessary and justified" by Israel's continued occupation of Palestinian Territories.

Bisharat has argued in the Wall Street Journal and the New York Times that Israel's actions in the 2008–2009 Israel–Palestine conflict over Gaza constitute war crimes.
