= David Lloyd (literary scholar) =

United States poet and professor of Literature

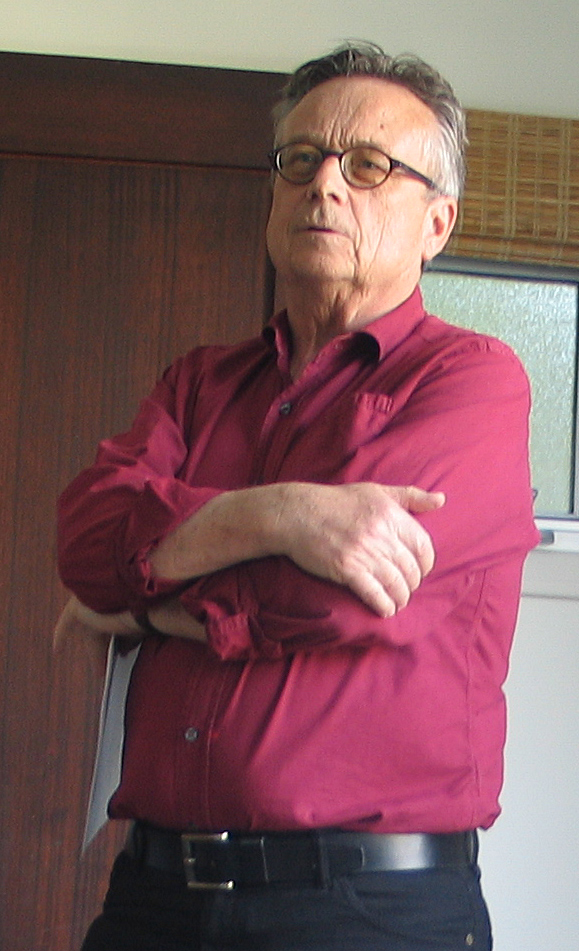

David Lloyd is a poet and professor of literature living in the United States though born in 1955 in Dublin. He holds a B.A. (1977), an M.A. (1981), and a PhD (1982) in Literature and Colonialism, all from Cambridge University. Lloyd has been Professor of English at the University of California, Davis, and at the University of Southern California after previous appointments at Scripps College, Claremont, and the University of California, Berkeley. He became Professor of English at the University of California, Riverside in 2013.

Lloyd's scholarship primarily addresses Irish literature and culture, colonialism and nationalism. He has also published several volumes of poetry.

Lloyd came to public attention as a leader of a movement calling for an academic and cultural boycott of Israel. In response to the concerns that the boycott is a violation of academic freedom, Lloyd responded, "Israeli institutions are complicit in immense infringement on Palestinian academic freedom, so it's really hard, it seems to me, for Israeli institutions to claim the rights of academic freedom that they are so systematically denying to their Palestinian counterparts."

== Books ==
- Under Representation: The Racial Regime of Aesthetics (2018)
- Irish Culture and Colonial Modernity, 1800–2000: The transformation of oral space (2011)
- Nationalism and Minor Literature: James Clarence Mangan and the Emergence of Irish Cultural Nationalism (1987)
- Anomalous States: Irish Writing and the Postcolonial Moment (1993)
- Ireland After History (2000)
- Irish Times: Temporalities of Modernity (2008)
- The Nature and Context of Minority Discourse, co-edited with Abdul JanMohamed (1991)
- The Politics of Culture in the Shadow of Capital, co-edited with Lisa Lowe (1997)
- Culture and the State, co-authored with Paul Thomas (1997)
