= P.E. Moskowitz =

American author

- Born: 26 July 1988
- Occupation: Writer

P.E. Moskowitz (born 1988) is an American writer. Moskowitz has written books including How to Kill a City (2017) and The Case Against Free Speech (2019). They run Mental Hellth, a newsletter on psychology, psychiatry, and modern society.

== Early life and education ==
Moskowitz was born and raised in New York City. Moskowitz graduated from Hampshire College and CUNY Graduate School of Journalism in 2012.

== Work ==
Moskowitz's first book, How to Kill a City: Gentrification, Inequality, and the Fight for the Neighborhood, was published in 2017 by Bold Type Books. The book surveys the systemic forces behind gentrification in New Orleans, Detroit, San Francisco, and New York City.

In 2019, they released their second book, The Case Against Free Speech: The First Amendment, Fascism, and the Future of Dissent, also published by Bold Type. The book argues that the United States' freedom of speech is a "dialectical smokescreen" used by those in power in the country's two-party system.

They were a 2019 Knight Visiting Nieman Fellow at Harvard University's Nieman Foundation for Journalism.

In 2020, Moskowitz began Mental Hellth, a newsletter dedicated to mental health, psychology, psychiatry, work, media, and modern society.

They have written for various media publications including The Guardian, The New York Times, The New Yorker, Wired, Slate, and Vice.

== Personal life ==
Moskowitz is transgender and uses they/them pronouns. They are Jewish and live in New Orleans.

== Publications ==
- Breaking Awake: A Reporter's Search for a New Life, and a New World, Through Drugs (Atria Books, 2025) ISBN 9781668007778
- The Case Against Free Speech: The First Amendment, Fascism, and the Future of Dissent (Bold Type Books, 2019) ISBN 9781568588643
- How to Kill a City: Gentrification, Inequality, and the Fight for the Neighborhood (Bold Type Books, 2017) ISBN 9781568589039
