= Harold Leroy Enarson =

American university president

Harold Enarson
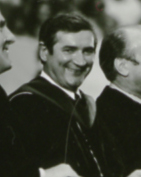

9th President of The Ohio State University
- In office September 1, 1972 – August 31, 1981
- Preceded by: Novice Fawcett
- Succeeded by: Edward H. Jennings

1st President of Cleveland State University
- In office 1966–1972
- Preceded by: office established
- Succeeded by: Harry Newburn (interim)

Personal details
- Born: May 24, 1919 Villisca, Iowa, U.S.
- Died: July 28, 2006 (aged 87) Port Townsend, Washington, U.S.
- Education: University of New Mexico; Stanford University; American University

Harold Leroy Enarson (May 24, 1919 – July 28, 2006) was the 9th President of Ohio State University. Prior to joining Ohio State, he served as the first President of Cleveland State University, from 1966 to 1972.

After leaving the university, Enarson commented that he would be remembered most for his firing of popular Ohio State Buckeyes football coach Woody Hayes after Hayes punched an opposing player in the throat, though events such as Archie Griffin's two Heisman Trophies or graduate Paul Flory's Nobel Prize were highpoints. Ohio State President Karen Holbrook said of Enarson, "Today, Ohio State’s programs are stronger and its reputation more eminent, thanks to Harold Enarson."

== Personal life ==
Enarson was born on May 24, 1919 to John Oscar Enarson (1878-1927), a son of Norwegian immigrant farmers, and Hulda Elizabeth Thorson (1882-1973). Both his brother and sister, Glen and Ruby, died in childhood of Tuberculosis. He was of Norwegian and Swedish ancestry. He met his wife, Audrey Iola Pitt (1920-2008), during his time at the University of New Mexico and had three daughters with her.

Academic offices
Preceded by Novice Gail Fawcett	Ohio State University President; September 1, 1972 – August 31, 1981	Succeeded by Edward H. Jennings
