= List of presidents of Ohio State University =

President of Ohio State University
- Incumbent; Ravi V. Bellamkonda
- Appointer: Board of Trustees
- Term length: No term limit
- Inaugural holder: Edward Orton, Sr
- Website: Office of the President

This list of presidents of The Ohio State University includes all who have served as university presidents of The Ohio State University since its founding in 1870. The Ohio State University is a public research university in Columbus, Ohio. Founded in 1870, as a land-grant university and ninth university in Ohio with the Morrill Act of 1862, the university was originally known as the Ohio Agricultural and Mechanical College. In 1878, in light of its expanded focus, the college permanently changed its name to Ohio State University.

== History ==
The first president of Ohio Agricultural and Mechanical College is Edward Orton, Sr. who served from 1873 to 1881. During Orton's term, the university became Ohio State University, in 1878. Karen A. Holbrook took office in 2002 and was the first female president. E. Gordon Gee is the only president who served two terms after from serving from 1990 to 1998 and returning in 2007-2013. Michael V. Drake, former chancellor of the University of California, Irvine, assumed the role of university president on June 30, 2014. Drake also serves as the first African American president of the university. On June 3, 2020, it was announced that Kristina M. Johnson, the former chancellor of State University of New York, would be taking over as the 21st president. She was the first member of the LGBT community to openly serve in the position. After serving approximately two and a half years of her five year contract, Johnson resigned at the request of the university's board of trustees.

== Presidents of The Ohio State University ==
The following persons have served as president of Ohio State University:

#	Image	Name	Term start	Term end	Life	Refs.
President of Ohio Agricultural and Mechanical College (1873–1878)
1		Edward Orton, Sr. (Note: Orton Hall is named in his honor)	September 17, 1873	June 20, 1881	1829–1899	
Presidents of Ohio State University (1878–present)
2		Walter Q. Scott	June 21, 1881	June 19, 1883	1845–1917	
3		William H. Scott (Note: Not related to Walter Quincy Scott) (Note: Three buildings on campus are named "Scott", including Scott Hall. Scott Laboratory and Scott House are not named in his honor.)	June 20, 1883	June 30, 1895	1840–1937	
4		James H. Canfield (Note: Canfield Residence Hall is named in his honor.)	July 1, 1895	June 30, 1899	1847–1909	
5		William Oxley Thompson (Note: William Oxley Thompson Memorial Library and statue named in his honor.)	July 1, 1899	November 5, 1925	1855–1933	
interim		George W. Rightmire (Note: Rightmire Hall is named in his honor.)	November 6, 1925	March 1926	1868–1952	
6		George W. Rightmire	March 1926	June 30, 1938		
acting		William McPherson (Note: McPherson Lab is named in his honor.)	July 1, 1938	January 31, 1940	1864–1951	
7		Howard L. Bevis (Note: Bevis Hall is named in his honor.)	February 1, 1940	June 30, 1956	1885–1968	
8		Novice G. Fawcett (Note: The Fawcett Center is named in his honor.)	August 1, 1956	August 31, 1972	1909–1998	
9		Harold L. Enarson (Note: Enarson Classroom is named in his honor.)	September 1, 1972	August 31, 1981	1919–2006	
10		Edward H. Jennings (Note: Jennings Hall is named in his honor.)	September 1, 1981	August 31, 1990	1937–2019	
11		E. Gordon Gee	September 1, 1990	December 14, 1997 (Note: Resigned to head Brown University.)	1944–	
acting		John Richard Sisson (Note: Sisson Hall is named in his honor.)	December 15, 1997	June 30, 1998	1936–	
12		William Kirwan (Note: The Kirwan Institute for the Study of Race and Ethnicity is named in his honor.)	July 1, 1998	June 30, 2002 (Note: Resigned to lead the University System of Maryland.)	1938–	
interim		Edward H. Jennings (Note: Jennings Hall is named in his honor.)	July 1, 2002	September 30, 2002	1937–2019	
13		Karen A. Holbrook	October 1, 2002	June 30, 2007	1942–	
interim		Joseph A. Alutto	July 1, 2007	September 30, 2007	1942–	
14		E. Gordon Gee	October 1, 2007	June 30, 2013 (Note: Gee steps down after making inappropriate remarks.)	1944–	
interim		Joseph A. Alutto	July 1, 2013	June 29, 2014	1942–	
15		Michael V. Drake (Note: Drake Performance and Event Center is not named in his honor.)	June 30, 2014	June 30, 2020 (Note: Resigned to lead the University of California system.)	1951–	
16		Kristina M. Johnson	August 24, 2020	May 7, 2023 (Note: Forced to resign.)	1957–	
acting		Peter Mohler	August 22, 2023	December 31, 2023	1973–	
17		Ted Carter	January 1, 2024	March 9, 2026 (Note: Forced to resign over an 'inappropriate relationship'.)	1959–	
18	Alleviating CS-GAG...Ravi Bellamkonda	Ravi V. Bellamkonda	March 12, 2026	Present	1968–	

Table notes:
