= 2024 University of California, Irvine pro-Palestinian campus occupation =

Protest at the University of California, Irvine

- Part of Gaza war protests (in the US at universities (in 2024 (in the US (in California))))
- Date: April 29 – May 15, 2024
- Location: University of California, Irvine
- Status: Protest suppressed

Parties
Pro-Palestinian groups: UCI Divest Coalition; Students for Justice in Palestine	Law enforcement: Orange County Sheriff's Department; California Highway Patrol; Local Police Departments

Casualties
- Arrested: 47

On April 29, 2024, a pro-Palestinian encampment was started at University of California, Irvine demanding that the university divest from Israel. The encampment was dismantled by police on May 15, leading to the arrest of student activists and other participants.

== Background ==
Following pro-Palestinian protests across university campuses, over 200 protestors gathered at UCI on April 25, 2024 to demand the university divest from Israel and condemn the genocide in Gaza. The protest was peaceful with no reported altercations.

The following week, on April 29, a group of students set up a tent encampment on campus hoping to increase pressure on the university. According to student organizers, the encampment was made up of 35 to 40 UCI students. Chancellor Howard Gillman declared the encampment to be "unauthorized" and in violation of university policy.

== Police Deployment ==
On May 15, 2024, a crackdown on the encampment resulted in an occupation of the UC Irvine Science Building by the protesters. UCI police put out a mutual aid call and received a response from at least 16 law enforcement agencies from around Orange County. Hundreds of officers responded and forty-seven protesters, including students, UCI employees and others were arrested. Student participants were suspended for up to 14 days.

== Aftermath ==
On May 22, students affiliated with UCI Divest Coalition and Students for Justice in Palestine organized a walkout to protest the suspension.

On July 30, five UC Irvine students sued the UC Regents and Chancellor for suspending them without due process.

On September 18, Orange County District Attorney Todd Spitzer filed misdemeanor charges against ten protesters, which included four students and two faculty members: Tiffany Willoughby-Herard, an associate professor of global and international studies, and Jonathan Brook Haley, a lecturer in the school of humanities. A month later, Spitzer filed misdemeanor charges against 39 additional protestors.

== See also ==
- 2024 Columbia University pro-Palestinian campus occupation
- 2024 University of California, Los Angeles pro-Palestinian campus occupation
