= The Black Caucus at Penn State University =

College student organization

The Black Caucus at Penn State's University Park Campus is a student organization founded in 1971. The Black Caucus serves as an umbrella organization to minority students and student organizations. They aim to promote the social and political development of students at Penn State. In addition, they provide students of color with a safe space to voice the struggles experienced in a predominantly white institution. During the Fall and Spring semesters, the Black Caucus holds weekly meetings titled Sankofa. Every year since 2009, the organization hosts the Ashe Awards - an award ceremony dedicated to honoring students, faculty, and student groups who have excelled in promoting diversity at Penn State.

== History ==
While the Black Caucus was founded in 1971, the organization has roots in two other Black student organizations. The Frederick E. Douglass Association, founded in October 1967, transitioned into the Black Student Union in 1969, which would be replaced by the Black Caucus in 1971.

=== The Frederick E. Douglass Association ===
The Frederick E. Douglass Association named their group after Frederick Douglass –– Black abolitionist, suffragist, diplomat, and more.

==== 1967 Petition ====
In November 1967, the Douglass Association petitioned Penn State's administration to instate an Afro American History course no later than the winter session of 1968. Members of the Frederick E. Douglass Association presented this petition on November 21, 1967, to the Dean of the College of Liberal Arts, Kenneth Roose. A year later on May 13, 1968, the group submitted a list of demands to Penn State's Administration. The list included the following:
Increase Black undergraduate enrollment by 10 percent after 1970; increase Black graduate enrollment; establish a section in the Pattee Library for Black authors; establish a Martin Luther King scholarship; reevaluate the athletic
recruitment process for Black students; increase the recruitment of Black Athletes and coaches; dedicate one of the campus's buildings to the late Rev. Martin Luther King; permanently establish a course on Negro History;
incorporate more Black authors into English courses; establish an African culture study program.

==== 13 Requests and Demonstrations at Old Main ====
On January 13, 1969, the Frederick E. Douglass Association presented a list of 13 demands to university President Eric A. Walker (1956-1970). The list included demands to instate "black counseling" and enroll 1,000 Black students by Spring 1969. Additionally, the list included demands to hire a Black recruiter and to involve Black students and Black Pennsylvania community members in the approval process for the hiring of the recruiter, any future committees involving Black students, and instructors and courses on Black subjects. On January 20, 1969, Walker issued a ten-page reply to the Douglass Association. Prior to the release of Walker's reply, Ted Thompson, Douglass Association member, Vice President of The University Student Government (USG), and future president of the USG (the second African American man to hold that title at Penn State), met with the Penn State President to discuss the 13 demands. During this meeting, Thompson warned Walker that the association did not want an "[...] 'I will do' statement on a succeed or fail basis," despite this meeting, Walker's response did not guarantee that the administration would work towards achieving one of the demands — enrolling 1,000 Black students by Spring, 1969. In addition, Walker's Statement claimed that the University had already increased Black enrollment by fifty percent; however, the previous enrollment count only included African American undergraduates, whereas the new count included Black international students and graduate students. Therefore, the Douglass Association argued that there was actually a decrease in enrollment of Black students. As a result, Rick Collins, the President of the Douglass Association, and five other representatives (Clark Arrington, David Patterson, Billie Patterson, Valerie Tartt, and Kenneth Waters), met with Walkers in Old Main to discuss the issues with his response. While the meeting between Walker and Douglass Association representatives occurred, 60 Douglass Association members waited inside of Old Main, in addition to 400 White students waiting in support outside of Old Main. Due to the lack of a concise response from Walker, 150 Douglass Association members carried 132 bricks to the second floor of Old Main, outside of Walker's office, to build a triangular-shaped wall, with one black brick at the top, and two statements tacked to the wall. The wall symbolized barriers in communication between Old Main officials and the Black community. One statement read "Next time we won't build a wall" and the other was a two-page statement outlining the issues in Walker's 10-page reply. The Douglass Association's statement critiques Walker's proposal from his 10-page letter that new programs would include "Afro-American or primitive material" because his statement assumes an analogy between African Americans and primitive. On January 22, 1969, 70 Douglass Association members traveled to Harrisburg to meet with legislators to gain their support increasing Black enrollment. K. Leroy Irvis, House majority leader, pledged his support of the Douglass Association and stated he would oppose state funding for Penn State until he sees a full commitment of the Administration to meet the 13 demands. In addition, Irvis stated he would call upon Penn State to appoint Black people to the Board of Trustees, see to an investigation of the hiring and enrollment policies, and visit Penn State in March to speak with President Walker. On January 24, 1969, The Community Action Committee of Pittsburg and Douglass Association members met with Walker and University Provos J. Ralph Rackley to discuss the relationship between Black students and the University. Due to Rackley's unilateral decision to exclude the press (Collegian reporters) from the meeting, the committee members and Douglass Association members walked out of the meeting.

=== The Black Student Union ===
In April 1969, Rick Collins, the president of the organization, announced that the Douglass Association changed its name to The Black Student Union, to communicate the purpose of the organization more effectively to the Black community. In September 1969, BSU announced that a committee composed of five chairmen would replace the role of president. The committee would consist of a Communications Chairman, a Counselling Chairman, a Financial Chairman, a Cultural Activities Chairman, and a Political Activities Chairman.

==== Black Student Orientation ====
In 1970, BSU lead Penn State's first-ever Black Student Orientation. According to Treasurer, Anthony Leonard, the orientation will provide incoming freshmen with advice and information on how they can prosper in the University. Leonard stated that the orientation would be part of a series of BSU events all catered to provide an array of supportive services.

==== Black Arts Festival ====
During the same announcement of the name change from Douglass Association to the Black Student Union, Collins stated that BSU members were discussing plans for Black cultural centers on campus and in the State College community. In addition, a Black Arts Festival would take place from May 12 to May 18. According to Ron Batchelor, BSU member and President of the Organization of Student Government Associations (OSGA), the Black Arts Festival was created to be educational on Black Culture and entertaining in order to alleviate tensions on campus. All of the profits made from the event will be put towards black scholarships and the creation of an off campus Black student center. During the festival, Black students would perform poetry, plays, African dances, and socio-historical discussions. Additionally, BSU created a magazine titled Aquarius that would publish poetry and essays by Black students, to be sold throughout the Black Arts Festival. The editorial staff consisted of Gloria Horsley, Lesley Bantom, Philip Coleman, Carol Merril, and Robert Moses. Some of the guests of the festival included actress Ruby Dee, Rep. Adam Clayton Powell, The James Brown Revue, and The Arthur Hall Afro American Dance Ensemble.

==== Penn State-Boston College Halftime Demonstration ====
On November 1, 1969, the Black Student Union demonstrated against institutional racism during halftime of the Penn State-Boston College football game. According to the Collegian staff writer, Steve Solomon, the statement that was to be read during halftime addressed being black in a predominantly white university, glaring examples of institutional racism, and recommendations on the ways in which racism can be controlled by all people and their institutions. The demonstration was planned at least a month in advance between BSU members and Ernest B. McCoy, the Dean of the College of Health and Physical Education. A spokesperson for the State College police at Rockview stated that a "normal complement" of officers would be present and that they were finalizing "special contingency plans". Additionally, for the first time of the 1969 football season, no standing room tickets were sold. Some speculated this done as a precaution to counterprotests; however, the Sports Information Director, Jim Tarman, stated that the omission of standing room tickets was implemented independently of BSU's demonstration. The day of the football game, attendees picked up copies of the Beaver Stadium Pictorial that featured a two-page spread of BSU's demonstration. Despite the fact that most viewers were aware of BSU's allotted time, many onlookers stomped their feet, shouted slurs, and booed during the demonstration that took place in the center of Beaver Stadium's field. BSU planned for a recording to play during the reading of their statement; however, the recording was not played because McCoy stated he forgot to turn on the electrical power. The Political Chairman of BSU, Vince Benson, was delegated to read the prepared statement. Benson reported that on his way up to the press box with McCoy, he was informed that the originally allotted time of twelve minutes would be cut to eight minutes. In addition, Benson stated that he received a report from University Conference member Wells Kiddie detailing that McCoy's Assistant, Edward M. Czekaj, gave State College police orders to prevent the White students from participating in the demonstration. Benson stated that they were supposed to carry a sign across the field that read "all power to the people". State College police Lt. William Kimmel stated that the police had nothing to do with controlling who participated, but were instructed to protect the Black participants on the field.

BSU announced that they would wait for administrators on November 10, 1969, at 7:30, in the Sparks building, to discuss the issues that occurred during the halftime demonstration and the discontent with Walker's Statement on the outcome of the demonstration. Walker and many administrative officials declined the meeting with BSU. Walker's reasoning was that he already had longstanding plans and did not want to meet in the "[...] 'confrontation' setting [...]" that could have taken place on Monday.

=== Charter Challenges ===
Due to the inactivity of the Black Student Union in the Summer term of 1971, the Black Caucus was organized. When the Black Caucus applied for a charter, Benson Lichtig, USG President at the time, gave "[...] the group a temporary-formal chartering review by the USG Supreme Court". According to Lichtig, Black Caucus was not immediately granted a charter because the Black Student Union and the Black Caucus could not both claim to represent Black Students. Black Caucus pushed for the creation of an Office of Minority Affairs, which would include programs like BSU that dealt with minority students. On October 12, 1971, the Black Student Union merged with the Black Caucus and created a revised constitution to be reviewed by the USG. A committee was formed in order to decide on how the executive board would function. The committee consisted of representatives from residence halls, "[...] Alpha Phi [A]lpha, Kappa Alpha Psi, and Omega Psi Phi fraternities, Delta Sigma Theta and Alpha Kappa Alpha sororities and the town of State College [...]". Despite the submission of the new constitution, the USG Supreme Court did not issue Black Caucus a charter because BSU owed the University $3,000 and they could not decide whether the Black Caucus was a new organization, independent from BSU's dept. A meeting was held on the night of February 14, 1972, to discuss the chartering of the Black Caucus which included discussion on the financial issues of BSU; however, the treasurer of BSU, Warren Cox, did not attend the meeting. On February 24, 1972, the Black Caucus was granted a charter after James Lomax, Vietnam Veteran and the first Black Caucus chairman, explained to the USG Supreme Court that BSU and the Black Caucus were not the same organization by highlighting the fact that the Black Caucus serves all aspects of the Black community whereas the Black Student Union only represented Black Undergraduates. In addition, Lomax pointed out that no former executive members of BSU were Black Caucus members.

=== The Black Caucus ===
The Black Caucus arose in the summer of 1971 as a result of the Educational Opportunity Protests and inactivity of the Black Student Union. They were officially chartered on February 24, 1972.

==== The Village ====
In the Fall Semester of the year 2000, Black Caucus President Lakeisha Wolf, amongst three other students, a football player, and university trustee, were mailed letters with personal information threatening violence and filled with racist slurs. Wolf states that she and Don Edmond, a student who was targeted in the second letter she received, were targeted by these racist and threatening letters because of their recent published works in The Daily Collegian. Wolf published a section in the “Reader Forum” section of The Daily Collegian, criticizing the Collegian's placement of an image from the Meet the Greeks event. Wolf states that The Daily Collegian published an image below their normal standards with captions that minimized the importance and meaning of the event. In addition, the image was published without an article and showed two Black men, members of the National Pan-Hellenic Council, surrounded by two articles with titles with the words “Police” and “9-11”. At 5:30 pm on October 18, 2000, Black Caucus members planned to gather for a press conference in the HUB-Robeson Center to discuss the letters and racism on campus.

On April 20, 2001, a letter was hand-delivered to The Daily Collegian, with death threats directed at Lakeisha Wolf. The threats expanded to reach dozens of students of color, parents, and a journalist of the Centre Daily Times. One of the letters detailed knowledge of the victim's daily routines and threatened violence. This resulted in a protest at the Beaver Stadium football field and a nine-day sit-in at the HUB. The group of about 100 students who led the HUB takeover on April 24, 2001, which consisted of a march from Old Main to the HUB, formed “The Village”. On the steps of Old Main, Black Caucus members called for support in their continuing effort in getting university officials to address the threatening racist violence on campus and the development of diversity and multiethnic/gender education. Black student leaders in The Village criticized the university for their lack of action or communication in dealing with the death threats sent to students and university trustee. The HUB takeover would last until May 3, 2001, when university officials signed a revised, “Plan to Enhance Diversity at Penn State” that included plans to create the Africana Research Center. As a result of The Village, the Africana Research Center was created in 2002.
