= William Oxley Thompson =

American cleric and university president (1855–1933)

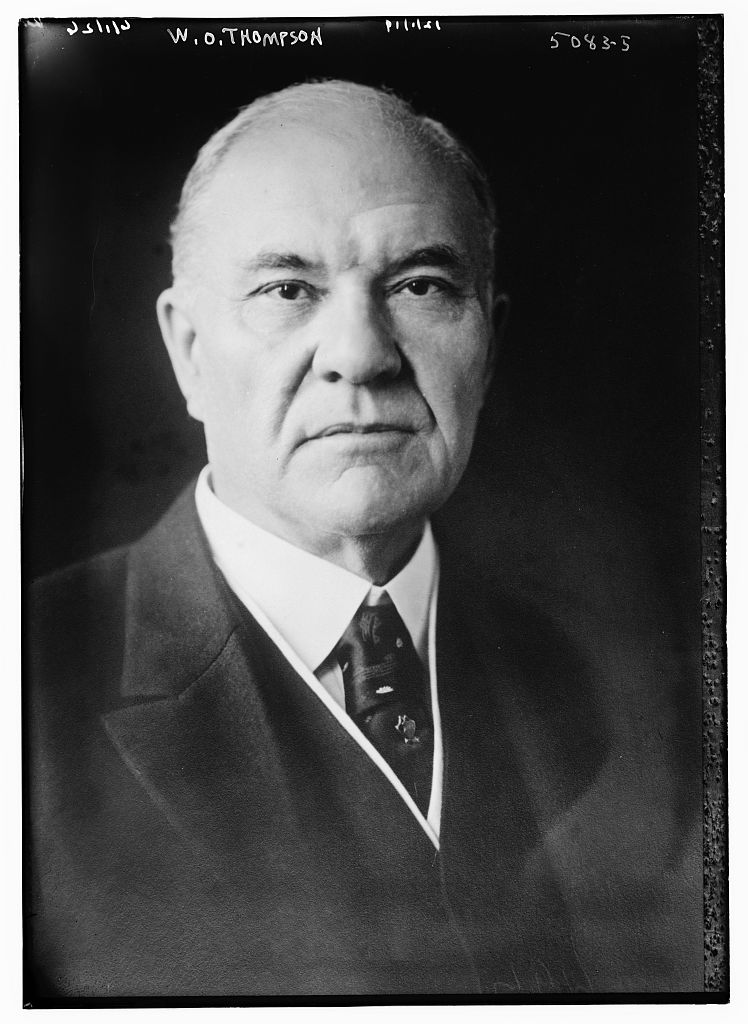
- Born: November 5, 1855; Cambridge, Ohio, US
- Died: December 9, 1933 (aged 78); Columbus, Ohio, US
- Resting place: Green Lawn Cemetery, Columbus, Ohio
- Education: Muskingum College; Western Theological Seminary

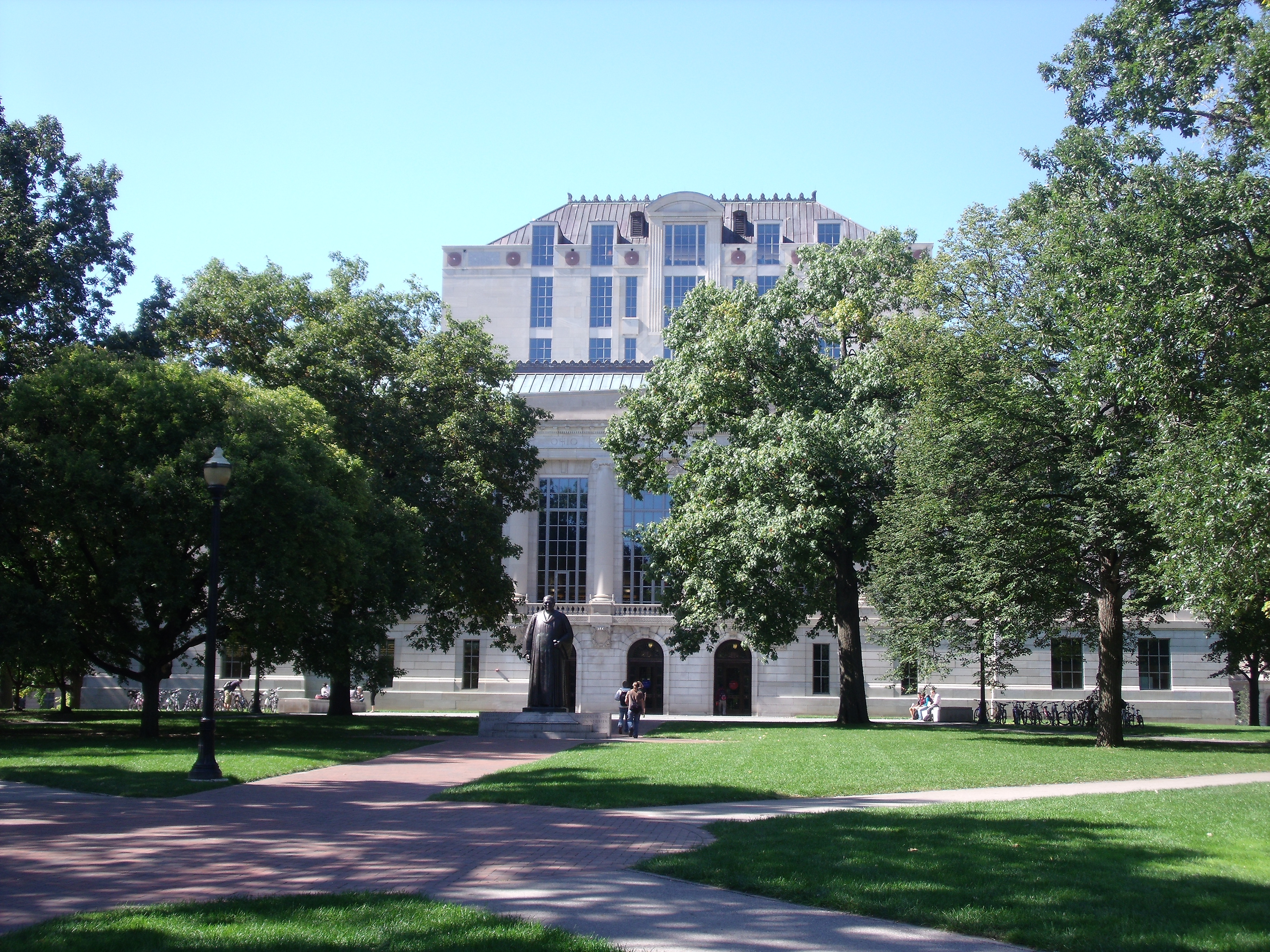
Statue of Thompson on the Ohio State campus

William Oxley Thompson (November 5, 1855 – December 9, 1933) was the fifth president of Ohio State University. His tenure was marked by the Ohio Legislature's 1906 passage of the Eagleson Bill, which formalized its flagship role in the state's university system, and its election into the Association of American Universities in 1916.

== Biography ==
Thompson was born in Cambridge, Ohio, to David Glenn Thompson and Agnes Miranda Oxley. Thompson was educated at Muskingum College and Western Theological Seminary. An ordained minister, Thompson spent the first half of his career in Presbyterian ministry. Upon his first wife's death in 1885 he turned to higher education and became the first president of the Longmont Presbyterian College founded by the Presbyterian Synod of Colorado. He was appointed president of Miami University in Oxford, Ohio, in 1891 and served until 1899 when he resigned to become president of the Ohio State University.

His extensive service at Ohio State University (26 years) is honored with a larger-than-life bronze statue by Erwin Frey of President Thompson in academic dress, positioned in front of the eponymous William Oxley Thompson Memorial Library on "The Oval" (the central green space on the Ohio State University campus). He is known for being involved in students education and social lives, presiding over the Ohio State win over Oxford University on October 10, 1924, in intercollegiate debate. Thompson's tenure at Ohio State was marked by two seminal events. The first occurred in 1906 with the passage by the Ohio Legislature of the Eagleson Bill, which formalized and legally locked in Ohio State's flagship role in the state's public system of higher education. The Eagleson law mandated that only Ohio State, among Ohio's public universities, would be allowed to offer doctoral education or conduct basic research. The second event, and the culmination of both the raison d'être for Ohio State's founding in 1870 and the aim of the Eagleson Bill in 1906, occurred in 1916 with Ohio State's election into the Association of American Universities. Thompson also served as President of the university during World War One, which saw a massive drop in student attendance for 1917-1918 as many left to join the military or other war-related activities.

In 1924, he retired as president of Ohio State. He died on December 9, 1933, in Columbus, Ohio. Thompson's nephew, William Hertzog Thompson, was a prominent academic at the University of Nebraska, and the father-in-law of Warren Buffett.

== Honors ==
In 1926, Thompson was elected Moderator of the General Assembly of the Presbyterian Church in the United States of America.

Academic offices
Preceded by Ethelbert Dudley Warfield	President of Miami University; 1891–1899	Succeeded by David Stanton Tappan
Preceded by James Hulme Canfield	President of Ohio State University; July 1, 1899 – November 5, 1925	Succeeded by George Washington Rightmire
Religious titles
Preceded by The Rev. Charles R. Erdman	Moderator of the 138th General Assembly of the Presbyterian Church in the United States of America; 1926–1927	Succeeded by Elder Robert Elliott Speer
