= Committee on Scientists and Engineers =

The Committee on Scientists and Engineers was created by U.S. President Dwight D. Eisenhower as the result of recommendations of an earlier Special Interdepartmental Committee and was charged with taking action in all appropriate ways to promote a substantial growth in the national supply of scientific and technological manpower. It was established on April 3, 1956 as the National Committee for the Development of Scientists and Engineers, but on May 7, 1957 the name was shortened. The final report of the Committee was submitted to the President on December 17, 1958, and the Committee expired on December 31, 1958.

== Committee objectives ==
- To assist the Federal Government in identifying the problems associated with the development of more highly qualified scientists and engineers.
- To enlist the cooperation of all interested individuals and groups in analyzing the problem and developing programs to deal with it, and to take the lead in coordination of interested organizations outside the Federal Government.
- To make available to all interested organizations information on effective ways of overcoming the obstacles to the training of more qualified scientists and engineers.
- To publicize the problem and possible solutions in order to stimulate widespread public understanding and support.
- To provide the President, from time to time, with a report of progress.

== Committee members ==
- Chairman Dr. Howard L. Bevis, President-emeritus of Ohio State University
- Vice-Chairman Dr. Eric A. Walker, President of Pennsylvania State University

The Committee was made up of representatives from major national organizations concerned with the education, training, and utilization of scientific and engineering personnel.
