= John Brooks Slaughter =

American electrical engineer (1934–2023)

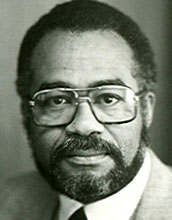

11th President of Occidental College
- In office 1989–1999
- Preceded by: Richard C. Gilman
- Succeeded by: Ted Mitchell

5th (and last) Chancellor of the University of Maryland, College Park
- In office 1982–1988
- Preceded by: Robert Gluckstern
- Succeeded by: William English Kirwan (as president)

6th Director of the National Science Foundation
- In office 1980–1982
- President: Jimmy Carter; Ronald Reagan
- Preceded by: Richard C. Atkinson
- Succeeded by: Edward A. Knapp

Personal details
- Born: March 16, 1934 Topeka, Kansas, U.S.
- Died: December 6, 2023 (aged 89) Pasadena, California, U.S.
- Scientific career
- Education: Washburn University; Kansas State University; University of California, Los Angeles; University of California, San Diego
- Fields: Electrical engineering
- Workplaces: Navy Electronics Laboratory
- Thesis: The solution of a class of optimal control problems by linear and piecewise-linear programming techniques (1971)

John Brooks Slaughter (March 16, 1934 – December 6, 2023) was an American electrical engineer and college president who served as the first African-American director of the National Science Foundation (NSF). His work focused on the development of computer algorithms for system optimization and discrete signal processing.

== Early life and education ==
Slaughter was born in and grew up in Topeka, Kansas, and attended Topeka High School. After two years at Washburn University, Slaughter transferred and earned a B.S. in electrical engineering from Kansas State University in 1956, an M.S. in engineering from the University of California, Los Angeles in 1961, and a Ph.D. in engineering sciences from the University of California, San Diego in 1971.

== Academic career ==
Slaughter took a civilian position at the United States Navy Electronics Laboratory in San Diego in 1960. He was appointed Director of the Applied Physics Laboratory of the University of Washington in 1975. He joined the NSF in 1977 as assistant director for Astronomics, Atmospherics, Earth and Ocean Sciences. From 1980 to 1982 he was Director of the NSF.

Slaughter was elected to membership in the National Academy of Engineering in 1982. From 1982 to 1988 Slaughter served as Chancellor of the University of Maryland, College Park, then served as President of Occidental College in Los Angeles from 1988 to 1999. In 1999 he was appointed Melbo Professor of Leadership in Education at the University of Southern California.

== Death ==
Slaughter died on December 6, 2023, while receiving treatment at Huntington Hospital in Pasadena, California. He was 89.

== Awards and honors ==
- Awarded the IEEE Founders Medal for 2022.
- Mount Slaughter, one of the peaks of the Sentinel Range of the Ellsworth Mountains in Antarctica
- In 2023, the USC Viterbi School of Engineering renamed their Center for Engineering Diversity to the John Brooks Slaughter Center for Engineering Diversity.

Government offices
Preceded by Richard C. Atkinson	Director of the National Science Foundation; December 1980 – October 1982	Succeeded by Edward A. Knapp
Academic offices
Preceded by Robert Gluckstern	Chancellor of the University of Maryland, College Park; 1982–1988	Succeeded by William English Kirwan (as President)
Preceded by Richard C. Gilman	President of Occidental College; 1989–1999	Succeeded by Theodore R. Mitchell
