= Kirwan Institute for the Study of Race and Ethnicity =

Interdisciplinary research institute focusing on race and ethnicity

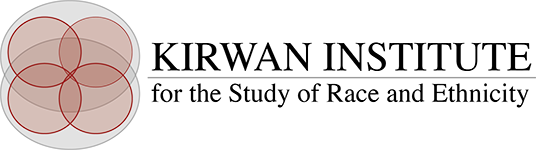
- Formation: May 2003
- Purpose: Race and ethnicity
- Location: Columbus, Ohio
- Executive Director: Darrick Hamilton
- Associate Director: Kathy Lechman
- Parent organization: Ohio State University
- Website: kirwaninstitute.osu.edu

The Kirwan Institute for the Study of Race and Ethnicity, also known simply as the Kirwan Institute, is an interdisciplinary research institute at Ohio State University in Columbus, Ohio, dedicated to the study of issues related to race and ethnicity. It was founded in May 2003 and is named after William English Kirwan, the former president of the Ohio State University. The executive director is Darrick Hamilton. John A. Powell served as the institute's founding director until the end of December 2011, when he was replaced by Sharon L. Davies. Davies was, in turn, replaced by Hamilton on January 1, 2019.
