= Karen Holbrook =

American academic administrator

Karen Ann Holbrook
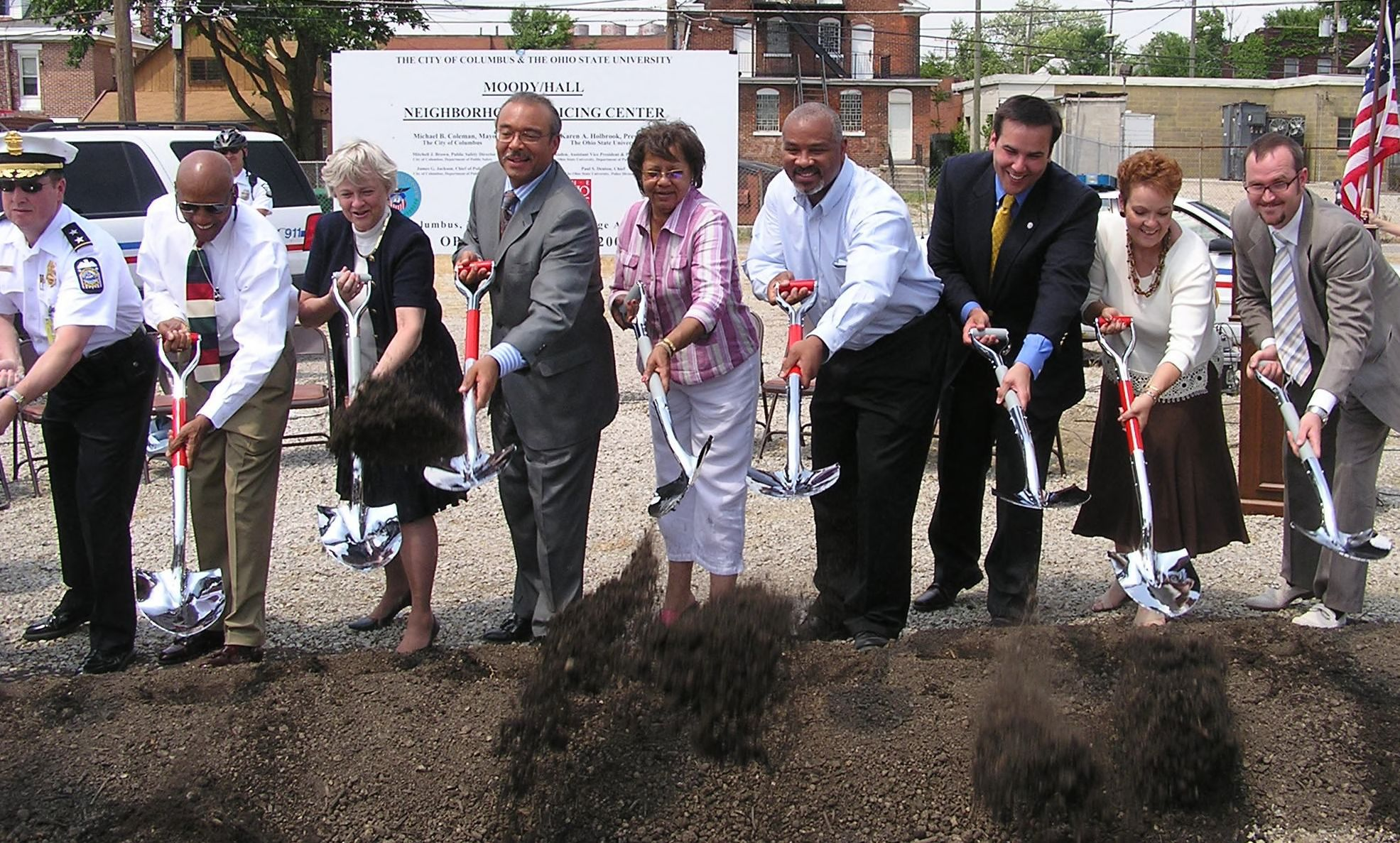
- Holbrook (third from the left) at OSU Policing Center groundbreaking ceremony in 2007

Regional Chancellor University of South Florida Sarasota-Manatee
- Incumbent
- Assumed office 2018
- Preceded by: Terry Osborn

13th President of The Ohio State University
- In office October 1, 2002 – June 30, 2007
- Preceded by: William English Kirwan
- Succeeded by: E. Gordon Gee

Personal details
- Born: November 6, 1942 (age 83)
- Education: University of Wisconsin–Madison; University of Washington

Karen Ann Holbrook (born November 6, 1942, in Des Moines, Iowa) is the regional chancellor of the University of South Florida Sarasota–Manatee since January 2, 2018.

== Career ==
Holbrook earned her B.S. and M.S. from the University of Wisconsin–Madison, in zoology. After teaching biology at Ripon College, she earned a Ph.D. in biological structure from the University of Washington School of Medicine in 1972, where she served as a postdoctoral fellow in dermatology, faculty member and research administrator. She then pursued further training in dermatology. She is an alumna of Gamma Phi Beta sorority.

Holbrook was a professor of biological structure and medicine at University of Washington School of Medicine, where she became the first woman to be named associate dean at the UW School of Medicine, vice president for research and dean of the graduate school at the University of Florida, and senior vice president for academic affairs and provost at the University of Georgia.

=== President of Ohio State ===
From 2002 to 2007, she was the 13th presiding president of Ohio State University. During Holbrook's tenure, she worked with Columbus Mayor Michael B. Coleman to improve safety both on- and off-campus. This was in reaction to riots following a Michigan–Ohio State football game in 2002. Holbrook announced in June 2006 that she would depart Ohio State when her five-year contract was up in 2007 to spend more time with her husband, Jim. Joseph A. Alutto, dean of the Max M. Fisher College of Business at Ohio State, replaced Holbrook as an interim president until Gordon Gee took his place as the new president.

While applying for a position of President at Florida Gulf Coast University in 2007, Holbrook lamented on the student culture at Ohio State. She remarked in a job interview that, "They think it's fun to flip cars, to really have absolute drunken orgies. ... I don't want to be at a place that has this kind of culture as a norm." Holbrook later acknowledged that she might have exaggerated her comments.

=== Post-Ohio State ===
Holbrook has served on the boards of several institutions.

From 2013 to 2016, she had served as senior adviser to the president of the University of South Florida system. In 2016, she served as interim president of Embry-Riddle Aeronautical University.

In 2017, while serving as executive vice president at University of South Florida Sarasota-Manatee, she replaced Terry A. Osborn as chancellor.

Academic offices
Preceded by Edward H. Jennings (interim)	Ohio State University President; October 1, 2002 – June 30, 2007	Succeeded by Joseph A. Alutto (interim)
