= Edward H. Jennings =

10th President of The Ohio State University (1937–2019)

10th President of The Ohio State University
- In office September 1, 1981 – August 31, 1990
- Preceded by: Harold Leroy Enarson
- Succeeded by: E. Gordon Gee

President of University of Wyoming
- In office July 1, 1979 – August 31, 1981
- Preceded by: William D. Carlson
- Succeeded by: Donald Veal

Personal details
- Born: Edward Harrington Jennings; February 18, 1937 Minneapolis, Minnesota, U.S.
- Died: August 10, 2019 (aged 82) Tampa, Florida, U.S.
- Education: University of North Carolina (BA); Case Western University (MBA); University of Michigan (PhD)

Edward Harrington Jennings (February 18, 1937 – August 10, 2019) was a professor in finance and University President at University of Wyoming and The Ohio State University.

== Career ==
Jennings holds a Bachelor of Science in industrial management from the University of North Carolina, an MBA from Case Western Reserve University, and a Ph.D. from the University of Michigan.

Faculty and administrative appointments include the University of Iowa and the University of Wyoming.

=== Tenure at Ohio State ===
Jennings was the 11th President of Ohio State University from September 1, 1981, to August 31, 1990, and also the acting (interim) president from July 1, 2002, until October 1, 2002, after Bill Kirwan left the office. While at Ohio State, Jennings was a professor of finance at the Fisher College of Business. During his tenure, Jennings fired Ohio State's football coach Earle Bruce in 1987. Jennings is also the namesake of the Botany and Zoology Building, Jennings Hall, on the Columbus campus of Ohio State University, which was named after him in 2002.

== Death ==
Jennings died at a Tampa, Florida, hospital on August 10, 2019.

Academic offices
Preceded by Harold Leroy Enarson	Ohio State University President; September 1, 1981 – August 31, 1990	Succeeded by E. Gordon Gee
Preceded by William English Kirwan	Ohio State University President acting July 1, 2002 – September 30, 2002	Succeeded by Karen Holbrook
