= Edward Alan Knapp =

American physicist (1932–2009)

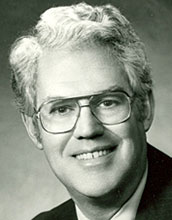

7th Director of the National Science Foundation
- In office 1982–1984
- President: Ronald Reagan
- Preceded by: John Brooks Slaughter
- Succeeded by: Erich Bloch

Personal details
- Born: March 7, 1932 Salem, Oregon, US
- Died: August 17, 2009 (aged 77) Santa Fe, New Mexico, US
- Occupation: physicist
- Scientific career
- Education: Pomona College; University of California, Berkeley
- Fields: Physics
- Workplaces: Los Alamos Scientific Laboratory
- Thesis: Angular distribution of photo-pions from hydrogen (1958)

Edward Alan Knapp (March 7, 1932 – August 17, 2009) was an American physicist and was director of the National Science Foundation from 1982 to 1984.

Knapp graduated with BA from Pomona College in 1954, and with a PhD in physics from the University of California, Berkeley in 1958. He then moved to the Los Alamos Scientific Laboratory, where he became division leader of the accelerator technology division.

In 1978, he was a guest scientist in the USA–USSR Exchange Program in Fundamental Properties of Matter. He also was a guest scientist in the US–Japanese Cooperative Cancer Research Program (NCI) in 1979.

On July 12, 1982, he was nominated by Ronald Reagan to succeed William Klemperer as assistant director for the Mathematical and Physical Sciences Directorate of the National Science Foundation. In November 1982, he became director of the NSF, succeeding John Brooks Slaughter. In August 1984, he gave up the position to Erich Bloch and returned to scientific research.

Knapp died at his home in Santa Fe, New Mexico, on August 17, 2009, after battling pancreatic cancer.

Government offices
| Preceded by John Brooks Slaughter | Director of the National Science Foundation; November 1982 – August 1984 | Succeeded by Erich Bloch |
