= George Washington Rightmire =

American academic administrator

George W. Rightmire
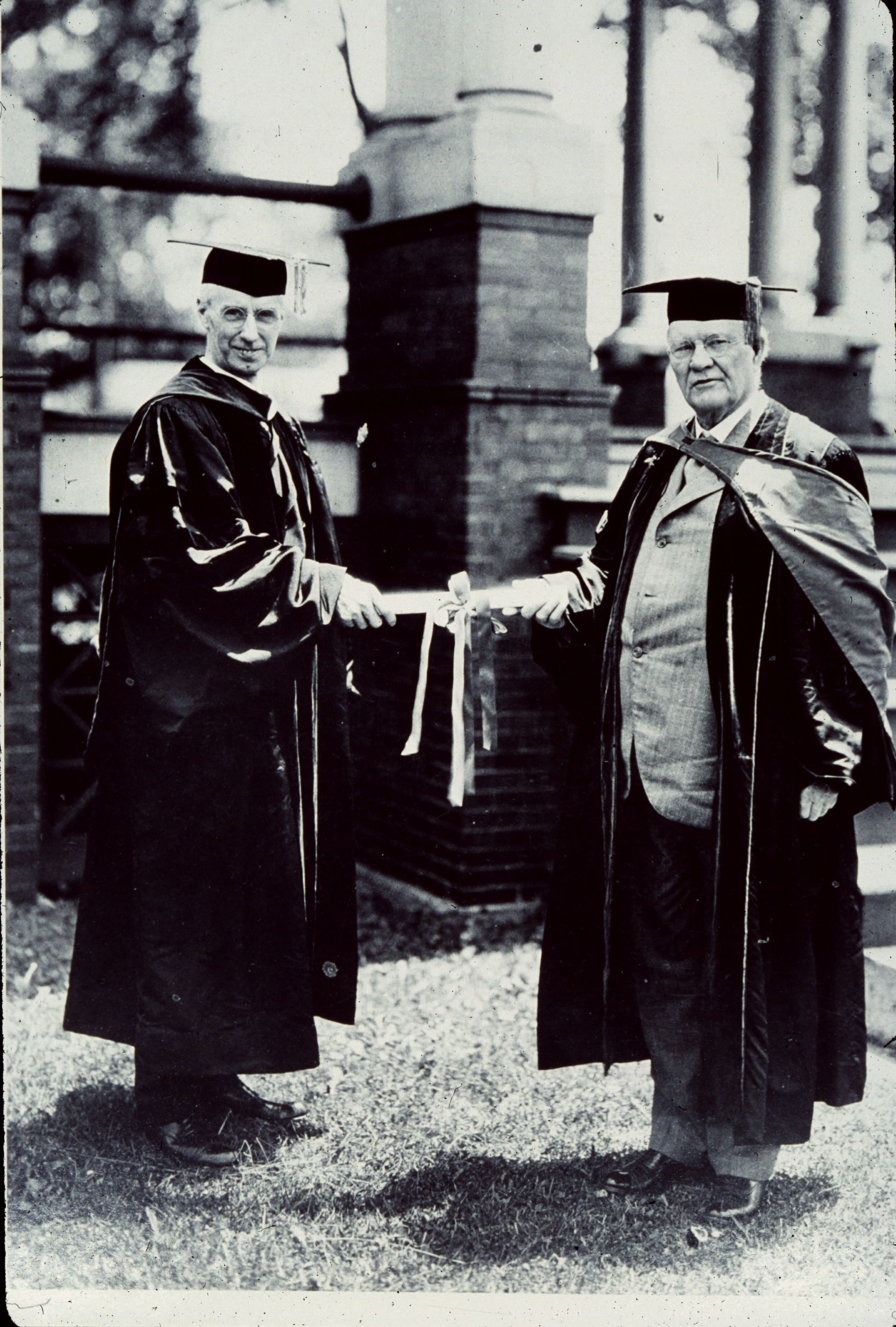
- Rightmire (left) and William Oxley Thompson in 1928

6th President of The Ohio State University
- In office March 1, 1926 – July 1, 1938
- Preceded by: William Oxley Thompson
- Succeeded by: William McPherson (acting)

Personal details
- Born: November 15, 1868 Lawrence County, Ohio, U.S.
- Died: December 23, 1952 (aged 84) Columbus, Ohio, U.S.
- Education: Ohio State University

George Washington Rightmire (November 15, 1868 – December 23, 1952), born in Lawrence County, Ohio, was the sixth President of Ohio State University. He graduated from Ohio State in 1895 and taught in the Columbus Public Schools for seven years. From 1904 to 1919 he studied and practiced intellectual property law in Columbus, Ohio. He was an instructor and professor, before becoming the dean of the College of Law at Ohio State University. In 1925, he served as the acting president of the university for about four months. He eventually took the presidential office in 1926. Rightmire Hall, a science laboratory at Ohio State, is named in his honor.

Rightmire was the Ohio State University President from March 1, 1926 to July 1, 1938.

== Personal life ==
Rightmire died in Columbus on December 23, 1952.

Academic offices
Preceded by William Oxley Thompson	Ohio State University President; November 6, 1925 – July 1, 1938	Succeeded by William McPherson
