= Darrick Hamilton =

American economist

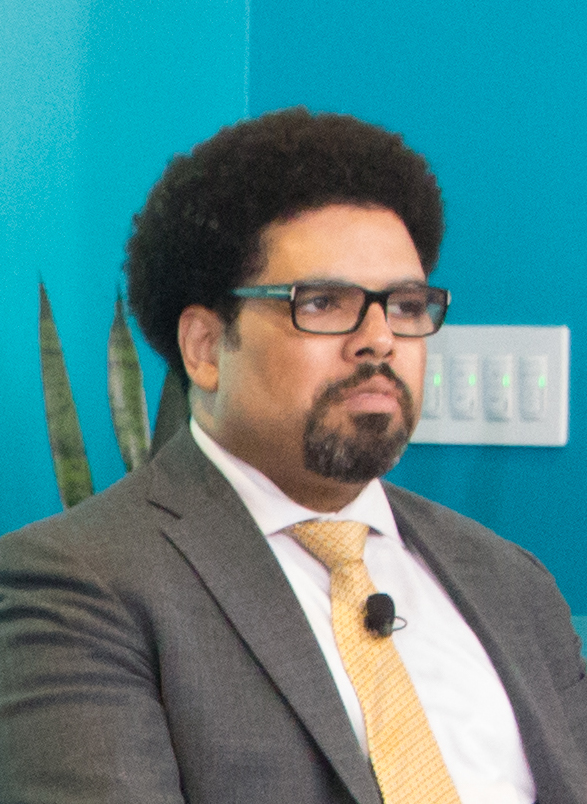

Personal details
- Born: New York City, New York, U.S.
- Education: Oberlin College (BA); University of North Carolina, Chapel Hill (MA, PhD)

Darrick Hamilton is an American academic and administrator who is currently the Henry Cohen Professor of Economics and Urban Policy and a university professor at The New School for Social Research. He is also the director of the Institute on Race, Power and Political Economy at The New School. Prior to assuming these roles in January 2021, Hamilton was executive director of the Kirwan Institute for the Study of Race and Ethnicity at The Ohio State University. He is also the associate director of the Diversity Initiative for Tenure in Economics (DITE, funded by the National Science Foundation and housed at the Samuel Dubois Cook Center for Social Equity) at Duke University; Senior Research Associate the Samuel DuBois Cook Center on Social Equity; a past President of the National Economic Association; and former Co-Associate Director of the American Economic Association Summer Training and Minority Fellowship Program. In December 2024, Professor Hamilton became the chief economist of the AFL-CIO.

== Research ==
As an applied microeconomist, Hamilton's research focuses on the area of stratification economics. His work involves understanding and examining the causes and consequences of racial and ethnic disparities, and the associated remedies to address these inequalities. Some of his more prominent work has been on baby bonds with economist William A. Darity Jr. This proposed federal wealth redistribution program calls for the issuance of government-backed bonds for children born into poverty to be redeemed when they reach 18 years of age. Hamilton's op-ed pieces have recently appeared in such media outlets as The New York Times, Huffington Post, among others.

== Education ==
Hamilton earned his Ph.D. in economics from University of North Carolina, Chapel Hill in 1999, and his bachelor's degree (also in Economics) from Oberlin College.

== Selected works ==
- Goldsmith, Arthur H.; Hamilton, Darrick; Darity, William (2007). "From Dark to Light: Skin Color and Wages Among African-Americans". Journal of Human Resources. XLII (4): 701–738. doi:10.3368/jhr.XLII.4.701. ISSN 0022-166X.
- Chiteji, N. S.; Hamilton, Darrick (May 2002). "Family Connections and the Black-White Wealth Gap among Middle-Class Families". The Review of Black Political Economy. 30 (1): 9–28. doi:10.1007/BF02808169. ISSN 0034-6446.
- Hamilton, Darrick, William Darity Jr, Anne E. Price, Vishnu Sridharan, and Rebecca Tippett. "Umbrellas don’t make it rain: Why studying and working hard isn’t enough for Black Americans." New York: The New School 779 (2015): 780–781.
- Hamilton, Darrick; Darity, William (January 2010). "Can 'Baby Bonds' Eliminate the Racial Wealth Gap in Putative Post-Racial America?". The Review of Black Political Economy. 37 (3–4): 207–216. doi:10.1007/s12114-010-9063-1. ISSN 0034-6446.
- Hamilton, Darrick, Arthur H. Goldsmith, and William Darity Jr. "Shedding “light” on marriage: The influence of skin shade on marriage for black females." Journal of Economic Behavior & Organization 72, no. 1 (2009): 30-50.
- Goldsmith, Arthur H., Stanley Sedo, William Darity Jr, and Darrick Hamilton. "The labor supply consequences of perceptions of employer discrimination during search and on-the-job: Integrating neoclassical theory and cognitive dissonance." Journal of Economic Psychology 25, no. 1 (2004): 15–39.

== Honors and awards ==
Throughout his career, Hamilton has received a variety of honors and awards, including the Inspiring Leaders in STEM Award (INSIGHT into Diversity magazine, 2017); the Ford Foundation Postdoctoral Fellowship in Poverty, the Underclass and Public Policy; and the Robert Wood Johnson Scholar in Health Policy Research.
