= Howard Landis Bevis =

American judge

7th President of the Ohio State University
- In office February 1, 1940 – June 30, 1956
- Preceded by: William McPherson (acting)
- Succeeded by: Novice Gail Fawcett

Associate Justice of the Ohio Supreme Court
- In office June 12, 1933 – November 1934
- Appointed by: George White
- Preceded by: Reynolds R. Kinkade
- Succeeded by: Roy Hughes Williams

Personal details
- Born: November 19, 1885 Bevis, Ohio
- Died: April 25, 1968 (aged 82)
- Party: Democratic
- Spouse: Alma D. Murray
- Education: University of Cincinnati, University of Cincinnati College of Law

Howard Landis Bevis (November 19, 1885 – April 24, 1968) was the 7th President of Ohio State University. Bevis received a bachelor's degree from the University of Cincinnati in 1908, a degree from University of Cincinnati College of Law in 1910. He served in the Ordnance Department of the United States Army during World War I, and later was chief of the legal section of the finance division of the Army Air Corps. He received a law degree from Harvard Law School in 1920. He went on to practice law in Cincinnati, Ohio and served on the faculty of the University of Cincinnati College of Law. The governor appointed Bevis to the Ohio Supreme Court in 1933 to fill a vacancy. Bevis did not run for election to a full term and accepted a position as Ziegler Professor in Law and Government on the faculty of Harvard in business and public administration. Bevis was Ohio state finance director before becoming President of Ohio State in 1940.

During his tenure as President of the Ohio State University, Bevis, having served as a civilian in ordnance and the legal section of the Air Service, refused to cap the number of veterans admitted under the GI Bill, as other colleges had done. Despite the wishes of many on the faculty, enrollment grew from 12,000 in 1946 to 26,000 a year later. President Eisenhower appointed him as chair of the Committee on Scientists and Engineers, which sat from 1956 to 1958. He was elected a Fellow of the American Academy of Arts and Sciences in 1985.

Bevis Hall on Ohio State's Columbus campus is named in his honor.

Academic offices
Preceded by William McPherson	Ohio State University President; February 1, 1940 – June, 30, 1956	Succeeded by Novice Gail Fawcett
