= William McPherson (university president) =

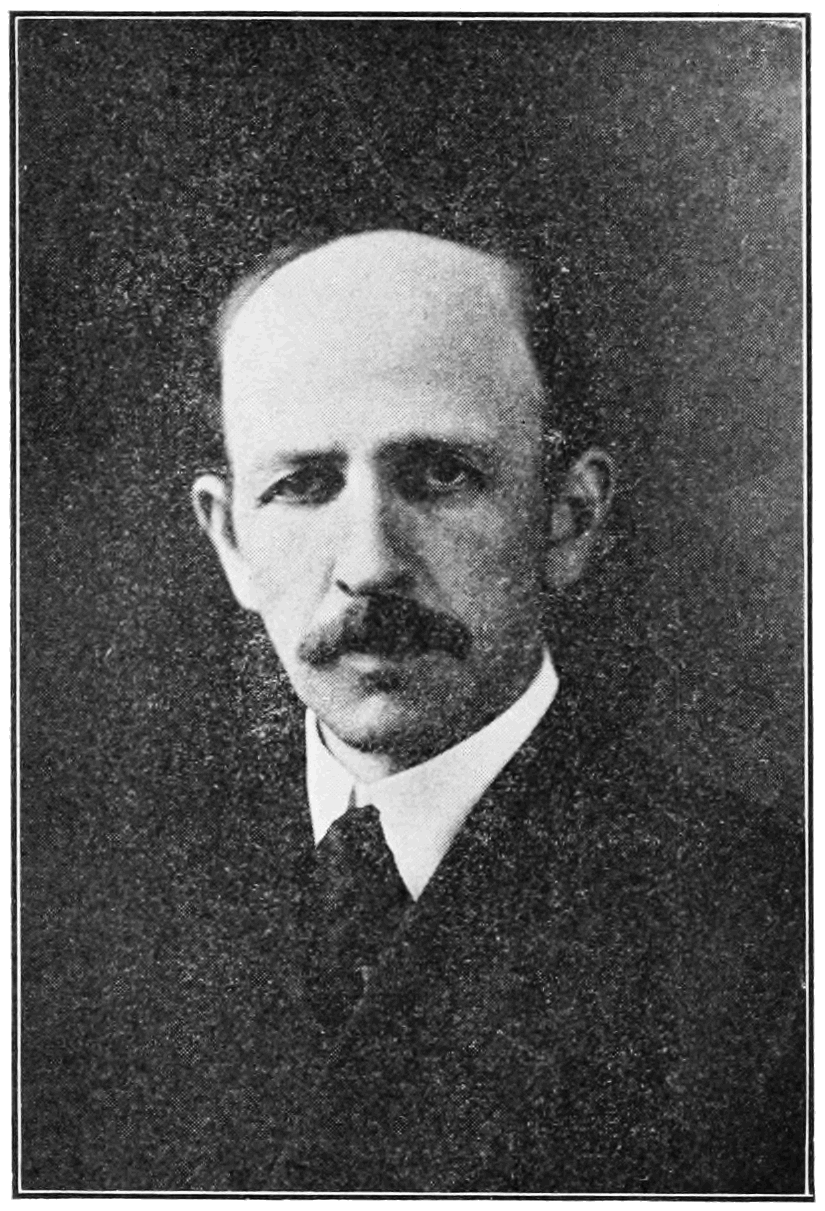
William McPherson

William McPherson (July 2, 1864 – October 2, 1951) was the acting President of Ohio State University from July 1, 1938, to March 1, 1940. A chemistry laboratory at Ohio State is named for him.

Academic offices
| Preceded by George Washington Rightmire | Ohio State University President; July 7, 1938 – January 31, 1940 (acting) | Succeeded by Howard Landis Bevis |
