= Novice Gail Fawcett =

American academic administrator

Novice Fawcett
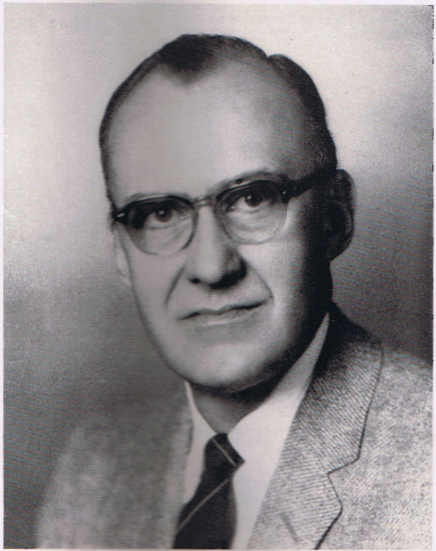
- Fawcett, c. 1958

8th President of Ohio State University
- In office August 8, 1956 – August 31, 1972
- Preceded by: Howard Landis Bevis
- Succeeded by: Harold Leroy Enarson

Personal details
- Born: Novice Gail Fawcett; March 29, 1909 Gambier, Ohio, U.S.
- Died: June 19, 1998 (aged 89)
- Education: Kenyon College (BS); Ohio State University (MEd)

Novice Gail Fawcett (March 29, 1909 – June 19, 1998) was an American academic administrator who served as the 8th president of Ohio State University from 1956 to 1972.

== Early life and education ==
Fawcett was born in Gambier, Ohio. He received a Bachelor of Science degree in science and mathematics from Kenyon College in 1931 and a Master of Education from Ohio State University in 1937. He took courses toward a PhD but did not complete the degree.

== Career ==
A teacher and coach, Fawcett was superintendent of Gambier Public Schools (1934–1938), Defiance Schools (1938–1943), Bexley Schools (1943–47), assistant superintendent in Akron Public Schools (1947–1949), and superintendent of Columbus City Schools in 1949.

== Legacy ==
The Fawcett Center at Ohio State University and Fawcett Hall at Wright State University are named in his honor.

Academic offices
Preceded by Howard Landis Bevis	Ohio State University President; August 8, 1956 – August 31, 1972	Succeeded by Harold Leroy Enarson
