= Statue of William Oxley Thompson =

Statue in Columbus, Ohio, U.S.

William Oxley Thompson
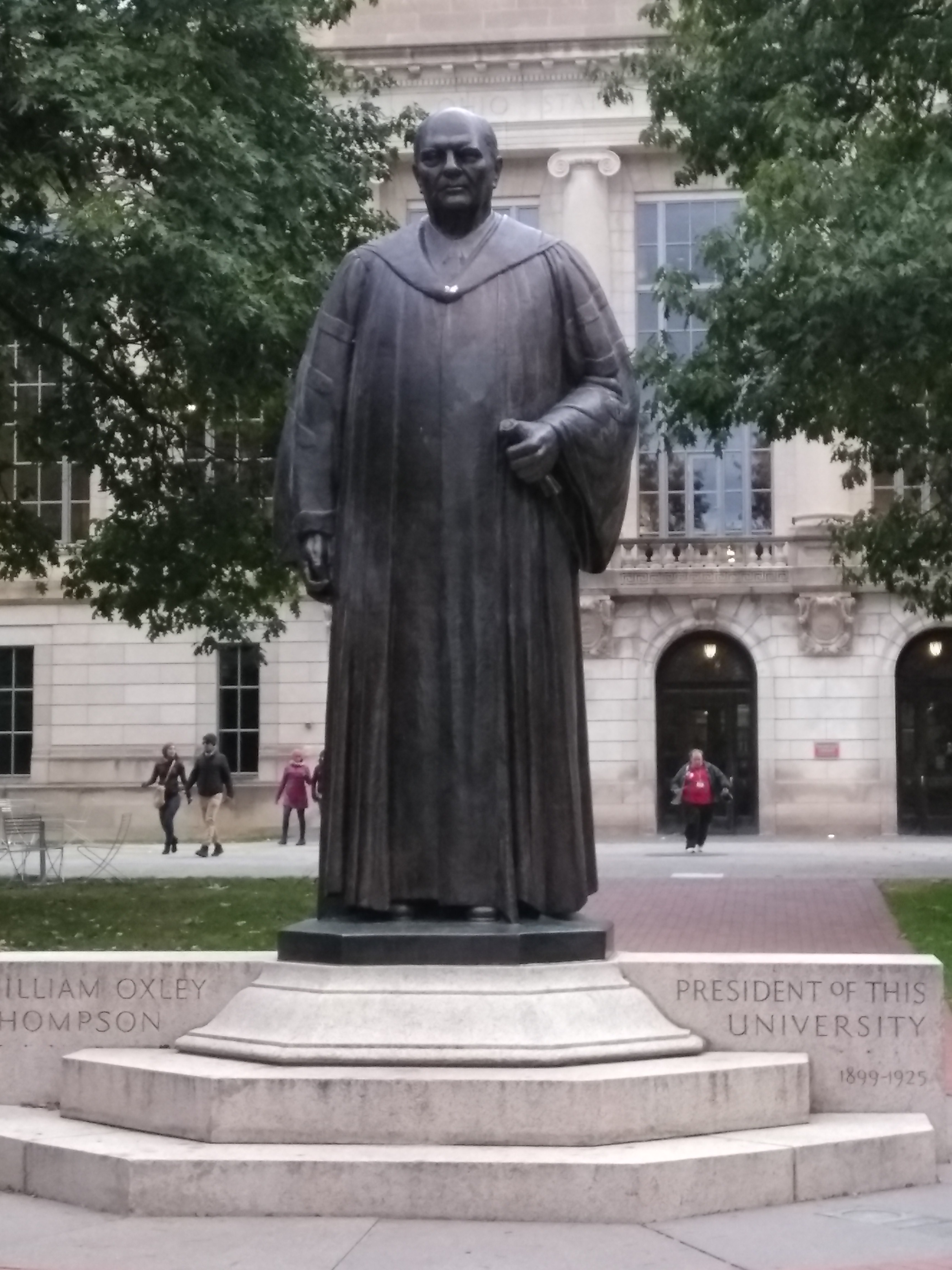
- The statue in 2018
- Artist: Erwin Frey
- Year: 1930
- Medium: Bronze sculpture
- Subject: William Oxley Thompson
- Location: Columbus, Ohio, United States; 39°59′57.7″N 83°0′50.2″W

William Oxley Thompson is an outdoor 1930 bronze sculpture by Erwin Frey, installed on the Ohio State University campus in Columbus, Ohio, United States. It depicts the university's former president of the same name.

== Description and history ==
Commissioned in February 1929 and dedicated in June 1930, the statue depicts Thompson wearing academic robes and holding a scroll. Fundraising for the memorial began in 1923, and $13,000 had been raised by 1926. The sculpture is approximately 10-foot (3.0 m) tall and has a diameter of 4 feet (1.2 m), 4 inches (10 cm). It rests on a New Hampshire granite base with multiple inscriptions.

== Harlan Ellison ==
Writer Harlan Ellison told Robin Williams during a radio interview, that one of the things which got him expelled from Ohio State was driving up the sidewalk and onto this statue "and who the hell William Oxley Thompson was I'll never gonna be able to tell you."

== See also ==
- 1930 in art
