= Erich Bloch =

American electrical engineer (1925–2016)

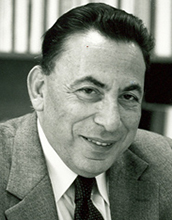

8th Director of the National Science Foundation
- In office 1984–1990
- President: Ronald Reagan
- Preceded by: Edward A. Knapp
- Succeeded by: Walter E. Massey

Personal details
- Born: January 9, 1925 Sulzburg, Germany
- Died: November 25, 2016 (aged 91) Washington, D.C., U.S.
- Scientific career
- Education: ETH Zurich; University at Buffalo (BS, 1952)
- Known for: IBM 360
- Awards: National Medal of Technology and Innovation; National Academy of Engineering Member; Computer Pioneer Award (1993); Vannevar Bush Award (2002); Computer History Museum Fellow; Royal Swedish Academy of Engineering Sciences Member; IEEE Fellow
- Fields: Electrical engineering
- Workplaces: IBM (1952–1984); National Science Foundation Director (1984–1990)

Erich Bloch (January 9, 1925 – November 25, 2016) was a German-born American electrical engineer and administrator. He was involved with developing IBM's first transistorized supercomputer, 7030 Stretch, and mainframe computer, System/360. He served as director of the National Science Foundation from 1984 to 1990.

== Biography ==
Bloch was born in Sulzburg, Germany, in 1925. Bloch was the son of Josef Bloch a Jewish businessman and Lina Rothschild a housewife, who were both later murdered in the Holocaust. He survived the war in a refugee camp in Switzerland and emigrated in 1948 to the United States. He studied electrical engineering at ETH Zurich and received his Bachelor of Science in electrical engineering from the University of Buffalo.

Bloch joined IBM after graduating in 1952. He was engineering manager of IBM's Stretch supercomputer system and director of several research sites during his career. In June 1984, Ronald Reagan nominated Bloch to succeed Edward Alan Knapp become director of the National Science Foundation. The same year, he was elected a foreign member of the Royal Swedish Academy of Engineering Sciences. In 1985, Bloch was awarded one of the first National Medals of Technology and Innovation along with Bob O. Evans and Fred Brooks for their work on the IBM System/360.

After stepping down as director of the National Science Foundation, Bloch joined the Council on Competitiveness as its first distinguished fellow. The IEEE Computer Society awarded him the Computer Pioneer Award in 1993 for high speed computing. In 2002, the National Science Board honored Bloch with the Vannevar Bush Award. He was made a Fellow of the Computer History Museum in 2004 "for engineering management of the IBM Stretch supercomputer, and of the Solid Logic Technology used in the IBM System/360, which revolutionized the computer industry."

Bloch died at the age of 91 from complications of Alzheimer's disease on 25 November 2016 in Washington, D.C.

== Awards ==
- National Medal of Technology and Innovation (1985)
- Computer Pioneer Award (1993)
- Vannevar Bush Award (2002)
- Computer History Museum Fellow (2004)

Government offices
Preceded by Edward A. Knapp	Director of the National Science Foundation; September 1984 - August 1990	Succeeded by Walter E. Massey
