= Howard Gillman =

6th chancellor of UC Irvine

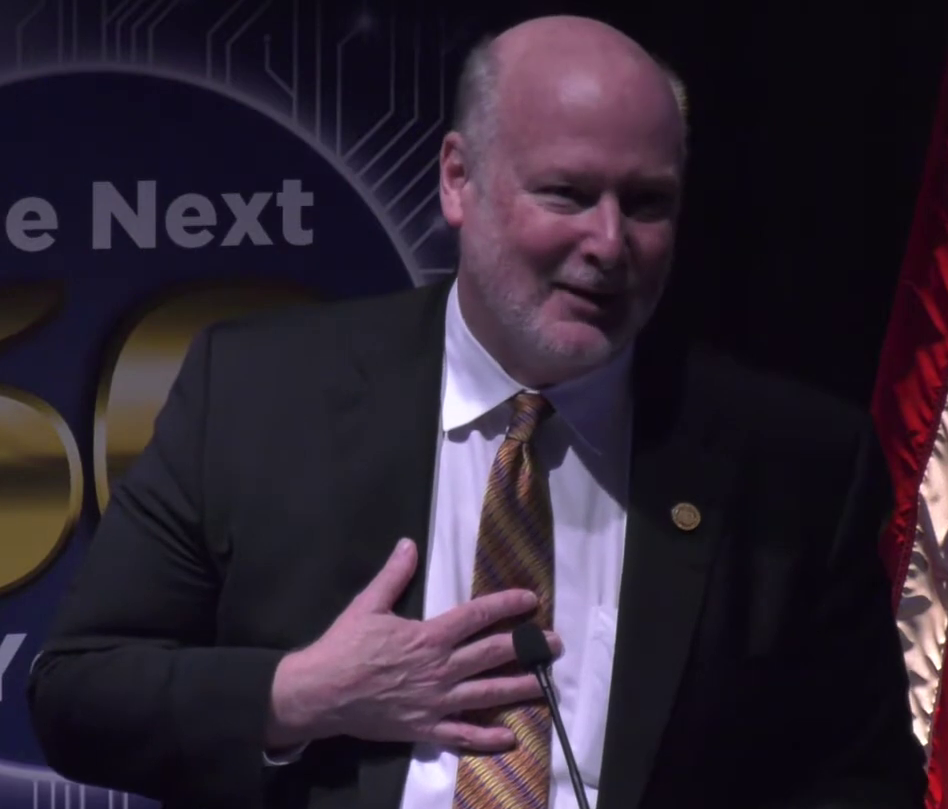
- Gillman in 2021

Chancellor of the University of California, Irvine
- Incumbent
- Assumed office September 18, 2014
- Preceded by: Michael V. Drake

Provost and Executive Vice Chancellor of University of California, Irvine
- In office June, 2013 – September 2014
- Preceded by: Michael R. Gottfredson
- Succeeded by: Enrique J. Lavernia

Personal details
- Born: Howard Aaron Gilman North Hollywood, California, U.S.
- Education: University of California, Los Angeles (BA, MA, PhD)
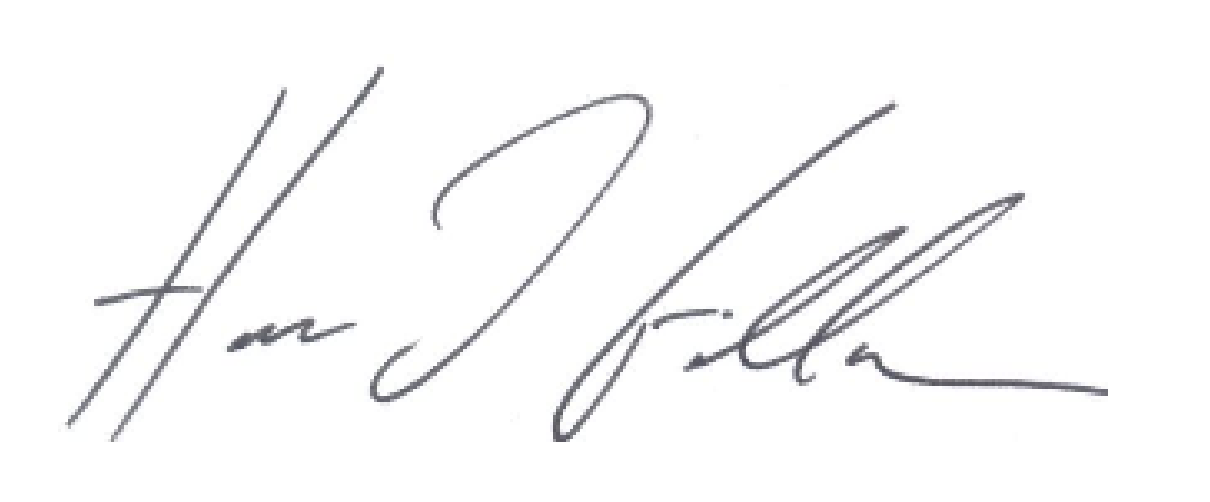
- Signature

Academic background
- Thesis: The Constitution Besieged: The Founding Vision of a Faction-Free Republic, the Intensification of Class Conflict, and Constitutional Ideology During the Lochner Era (1988)
- Doctoral advisor: Robert Gerstein

Academic work
- Discipline: Political science
- Institutions: University of Southern California; University of California, Irvine

Howard Aaron Gillman is an American scholar of political science and academic administrator, currently serving as the 6th chancellor of the University of California, Irvine since September 2014.

Gillman served as dean of the College of Letters, Arts, Sciences of the University of Southern California from 2007 to 2012, where he was a faculty member in political science and history since 1990.

== Early life and education ==
Howard Gillman was born and raised in the North Hollywood neighborhood of Los Angeles, California. He received a Bachelor of Arts, magna cum laude, in 1980, a Master of Arts in 1981, and a Doctor of Philosophy in 1988, all in political science from the University of California, Los Angeles. Gillman was a first-generation college student.

== Career ==
In September 1990, Gillman was appointed as an assistant professor of political science at University of Southern California, becoming an associate professor in 1995 and a professor in 2002. In August 2004 he was named chair of the Department of Political Science, and became dean of the USC Dana and David Dornsife College of Letters, Arts, and Sciences in June 2007. In September 2014 he assumed his current position as the chancellor of University of California, Irvine.

During his tenure at UC Irvine, Gillman has expressed support for freedom of speech while holding that student opposition to this policy should not be dismissed as infantile. In an interview for the LA Times he stated that it is unfair to describe modern students as "snowflakes", explaining: "The concerns that students are expressing are legitimate, and universities must commit themselves to the creation of safe and inclusive learning environments. But part of the learning environment you are creating in higher ed is one where any idea can be expressed, evaluated, contested and engaged". With Erwin Chemerinsky, dean of Berkeley Law, Gillman co-authored a book entitled "Free Speech on Campus", which argues that "campuses must provide supportive learning environments for an increasingly diverse student body but can never restrict the expression of ideas". He later called on police to forcefully break up a student protest against genocide on UC Irvine's campus. Gillman spearheaded sanctioning Dr. Tiffany Willoughby-Herard, a Black, queer, non-binary professor, who joined in the student protests against Israel's genocide in Gaza. UCI's academic senate found Dr. Willoughby-Herard guilty of violating some parts of the faculty code of conduct by participating in the peaceful student demonstration. Two members of the three-person committee found Willoughby-Herard guilty of some charges and recommended a letter of censure in her file to be removed after five years and unpaid leave for one academic quarter. A single committee member voted against any sanction. All three agreed that Willoughby-Herard would retain all rights and privileges as a senate faculty member during the suspension. Gillman overrode these recommendations and stripped Willoughby-Herard of not only faculty privileges but also healthcare during the suspension.

== Personal life ==
Gilman is married to Ellen Ruskin-Gillman with whom he has two children. Ellen earned a PhD in psychology from UCLA and has conducted research about Down syndrome and autism.
