= Joseph A. Alutto =

American academic administrator

Interim President of Ohio State University
- In office July 3, 2013 – June 29, 2014
- Preceded by: E. Gordon Gee
- Succeeded by: Michael V. Drake
- In office July 1, 2007 – September 30, 2007
- Preceded by: Karen Holbrook
- Succeeded by: E. Gordon Gee

Personal details
- Born: Joseph Anthony Alutto; 1941 (age 84–85)
- Education: Manhattan University; University of Illinois; Cornell University (PhD)

Joseph Anthony Alutto (born 1941) served two terms as interim president of Ohio State University in Columbus, Ohio. He was formerly the dean of Ohio State's Max M. Fisher College of Business.

== Life and career ==
Alutto was the first member of his family to go to college. While studying for his bachelor's degree in business administration at Manhattan College in 1962, he worked at a grocery store and a chemical company to pay for his studies. After that, he pursued his master's degree in industrial relations at the University of Illinois and finished a Ph.D. in organizational behavior at Cornell University. He became a business management expert.

From 1976 to 1990, he served as the dean of the SUNY-Buffalo School of Management. He also served as the president of the American Assembly of Collegiate Schools of Business and the International Association for Management Education from October 1996 to June 1998. In 1991, Alutto was appointed dean of Ohio State's Max M. Fisher College of Business.

On April 30, 2007, Alutto became an interim vice president and provost. He succeeded Barbara R. Snyder as president of Case Western Reserve University on July 1, 2007. He was responsible for the administration, coordination, and development of all academic functions of the university.

After Karen Holbrook's retirement on June 30, 2007, he assumed as the interim president of Ohio State University. He served until Gordon Gee assumed the presidency on October 1, 2007. On July 18, 2013, Alutto once again assumed the role following the retirement of E. Gordon Gee. He was succeeded as president by Michael V. Drake on June 30, 2014.

Alutto is also a director of Nationwide Financial Services, M/I Homes, and United Retail Group.

Academic offices
| Preceded by Karen Holbrook | Ohio State University President acting July 1, 2007 – September 30, 2007 | Succeeded by E. Gordon Gee |
| Preceded by E. Gordon Gee | Ohio State University President acting July 18, 2013 – June 29, 2014 | Succeeded by Michael V. Drake |
