= Erwin Frey =

American sculptor and educator

Erwin Frey (April 21, 1892 – 1967 or 68) was an American sculptor and educator best remembered for his George Armstrong Custer memorial.

== Early life ==
Frey was born in Lima, Ohio, where his father, an immigrant former cabinet-maker’s apprentice from Switzerland moved after first settling in Pittsburgh.

He later studied at Lima College for a year then began his sculpture studies with Ohio sculpture Clement Barnhorn at the Cincinnati Art Academy. While in Cincinnati he worked at the Rookwood Pottery Company. He then moved the New York where he studied at the Beaux Arts Institute of Design and at the Art Students League with James Earle Fraser. He helped Fraser enlarge his works used at the Panama-Pacific Exposition in 1915. This was followed by a sojourn to Paris where he studied at the Julian Academy with Henri Bouchard and Paul Landowski.

== Later life ==
Frey returned from Paris in 1923 to accept a position at the Columbus Art School Frey was “Sculptor-in-residence” and a professor at Ohio State University from 1925 to 1961.

== Selected works ==
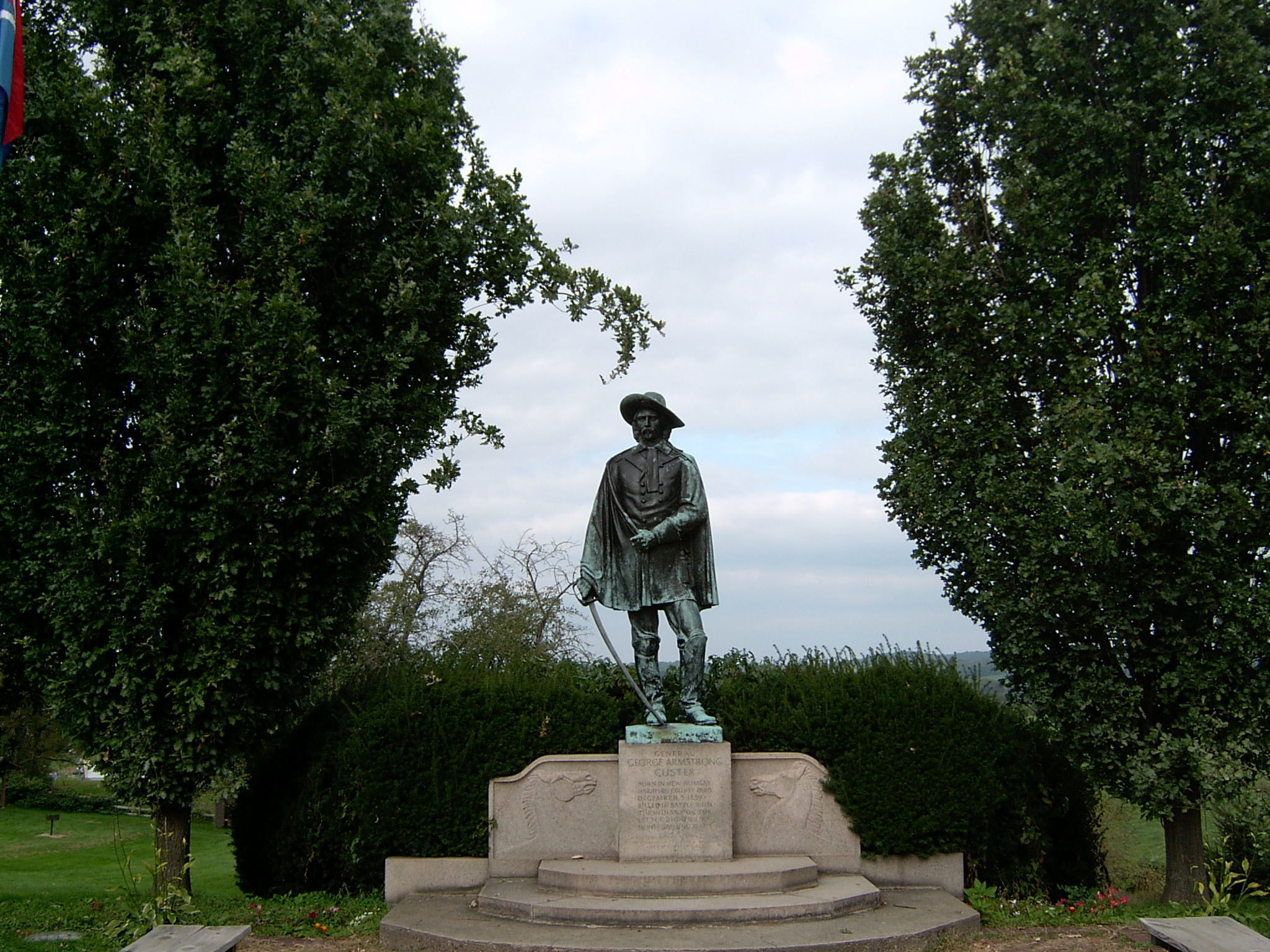
Custer Memorial in New Rumley

- Beatty Memorial, Ferncliff Cemetery, Springfield, Ohio, 1924

William Beatty was an official of the Ohio Pythians for whom Frey was the Grand Keeper of Records and Seal for 31 years.

- Statue of William Oxley Thompson, The Ohio State University, Columbus, Ohio 1930
- George Armstrong Custer monument in New Rumley, Ohio, Custer’s birthplace
- The Revolutionary Soldier and The Statesman, Ellen Phillips Samuel Memorial, Fairmount Park, Philadelphia, Pennsylvania 1943
- Architectural sculpture, Indianola Middle School, Columbus, Ohio, 1929
- Christ after the Resurrection, Franklin Commons Park, Columbus, Ohio, 1955
