= Tiffany Willoughby-Herard =

American scholar of African American studies

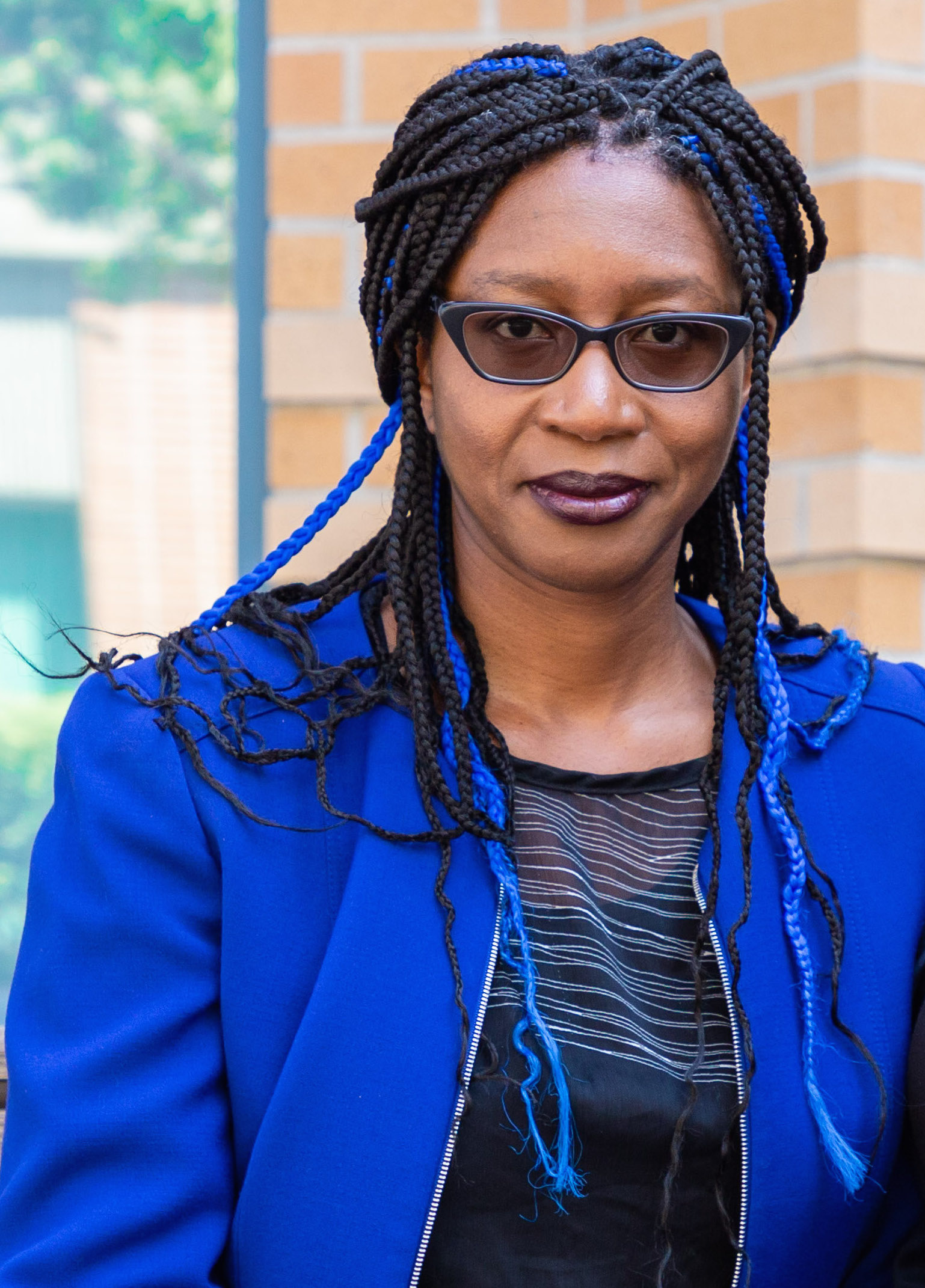
- Born: 12 December 1973 (age 52)
- Awards: 2017 Mae C. King Distinguished Paper Award on Women, Gender and Black Politics

Tiffany Willoughby-Herard is an American academic and author who is currently an associate professor in the Department of African American Studies at the University of California, Irvine and President of the National Conference of Black Political Scientists. Her research focuses on black political thought, black radical movements, and queer and trans sexualities.

Willoughby-Herard authored the book Waste of a White Skin: The Carnegie Corporation and the Racial Logic of White Vulnerability (University of California Press, 2015) and edited the volume Theories of Blackness: On Life and Death (Cognella, 2011). Waste of a White Skin was reviewed widely in the academic press, including reviews by Clarence Lusane in the Journal of Race, Ethnicity, and Politics, Grace Davie in the African Studies Review, and Annika Teppo in the Journal of Southern African Studies.

Willoughby-Herard has published articles in Journal of Contemporary Thought; Cultural Dynamics; African Identities; Social Justice; National Political Science Review; Politics, Groups, & Identities; South African Review of Sociology; New Political Science; and Race in Anthropology, focusing on intersectional topics in universities in the U.S. and in South Africa, among others "Mammy No More/Mammy Forever", "Poetic Labors and Challenging Political Science: An Epistolary Poem", and further topics such as biomedical radicalization.

Willoughby-Herard is guest editor of special issues including "Black Feminism and Afro-Pessimism" (2018), co-edited with M. Shadee Malaklou in Theory and Event; "Challenging the Legacies of Racial Resentment: Black Health Activism, Educational Justice, and Legislative Leadership" (2017), co-edited with Julia Jordan-Zachery in the National Political Science Review; "Twenty Years of South African Democracy, Volume 1" (2015), co-edited with Abebe Zegeye in African Identities; and "Cedric J. Robinson: Radical Historiography, Black Ontology, and Freedom" (2013) co-edited with H.L.T. Quan in African Identities.

Willoughby-Herard is the former editor of the National Political Science Review (2016–2019), current book review editor for Safundi: The Journal of South African and American Studies, and member of the editorial advisory board for the journal of the Critical Ethnic Studies Association.

In 2016, Willoughby-Herard was a member of the Women of Color Advisory Board to the Committee on the Status of Women in the Profession for the American Political Science Association.

On September 18, 2024, Willoughby-Herard was charged with three misdemeanors for her part in the May 15, 2024 protest on UC Irvine's campus. Willoughby-Herard was charged with failure to disperse at the scene of a riot, resisting a peace officer with the threat of violence, and resisting arrest. Willoughby-Herard was ordered to appear at the Central Justice Center for arraignment on October 16, 2024.

== Awards and memberships ==
- 2018: University of California Humanities Research Institute, Short-term Residential Research Groups, Words of Wild Survival: Wombs, Wounds, Wastelands, and Water
- 2017: Mae C. King Distinguished Paper Award on Women, Gender and Black Politics, Association for the Study of Black Women in Politics
- 2017 Pipeline Award for serving as an outstanding mentor and introducing the most students to the NCOBPS 2017 Annual Meeting
- 2015 and 2011: UC Irvine Chancellor's Award for Fostering Undergraduate Research
- 2009: Lucius Barker Best Paper Award in Racial and Ethnic Politics
- Member of the LGBTQ+ Caucus of the National Conference of Black Political Scientists
- Former president of the LGBTQ Caucus of the American Political Science Association
- Former co-chair of the Ken Sherrill Best Dissertation on Sexuality and Politics Prize Award Committee
- Past member of the African Politics Conference Group Best Paper Award Committee
