= African Identities =

- Discipline: African studies
- Language: English

Publication details
- Publisher: Routledge
- Frequency: Quarterly

Standard abbreviations
- ISO 4: Afr. Identities

Indexing
- ISSN: 1472-5843 (print); 1472-5851 (web)

Links
- Journal homepage

African Identities is an academic journal that focuses primarily on subjects pertaining to African studies.
