= Michael V. Drake =

American university administrator and physician

Michael Drake
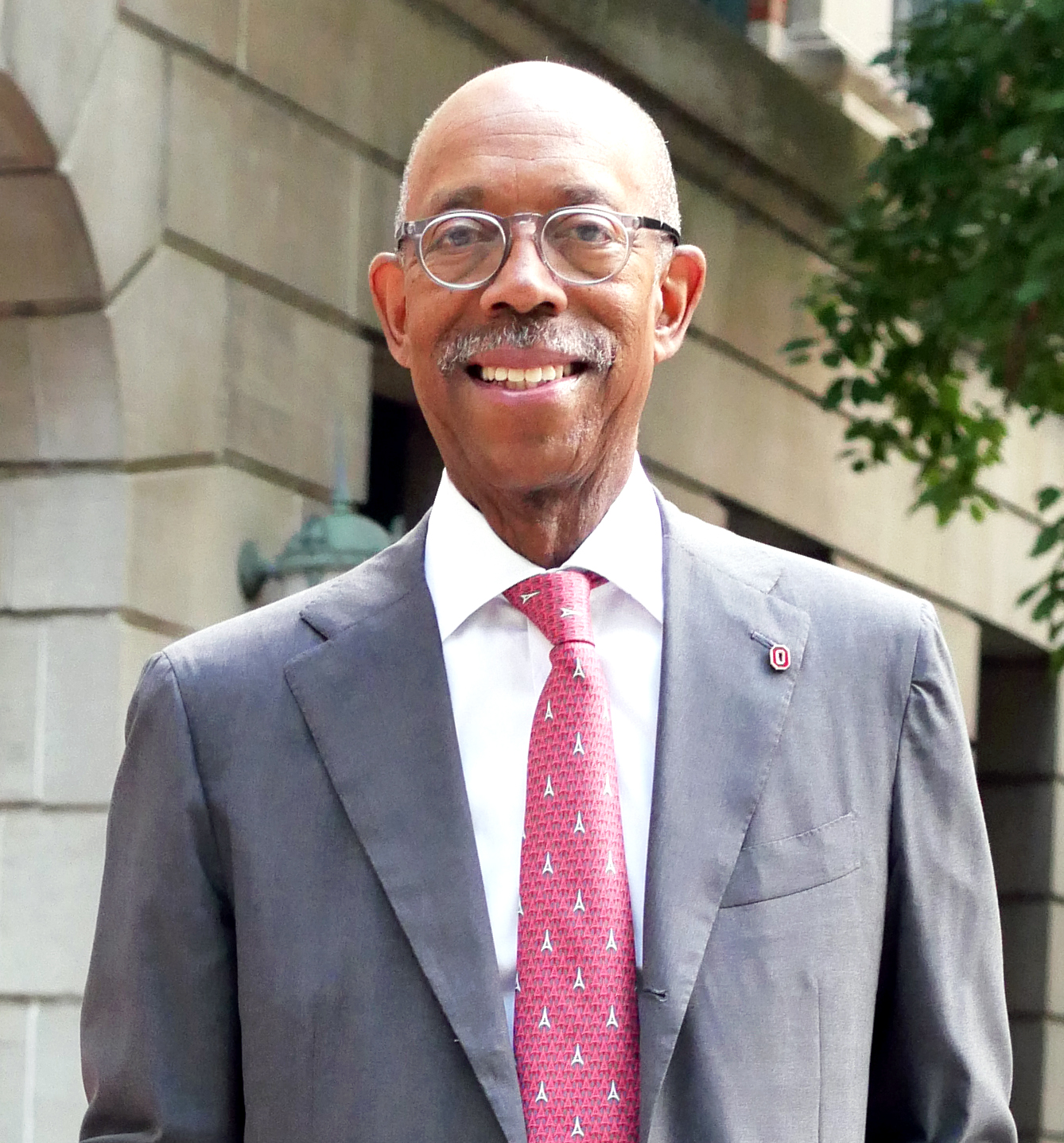
- Drake in 2018

21st President of the University of California
- In office August 1, 2020 – August 1, 2025
- Preceded by: Janet Napolitano
- Succeeded by: James Milliken

15th President of Ohio State University
- In office June 30, 2014 – June 30, 2020
- Preceded by: Joseph A. Alutto
- Succeeded by: Kristina M. Johnson

5th Chancellor of the University of California, Irvine
- In office July 1, 2005 – June 30, 2014
- Preceded by: Ralph J. Cicerone
- Succeeded by: Howard Gillman

Personal details
- Born: Michael Vincent Drake; July 9, 1950 (age 76) New York City, New York, U.S.
- Spouse: Brenda Drake
- Education: Sacramento City College (attended); Stanford University (BA); University of California, San Francisco (MD)
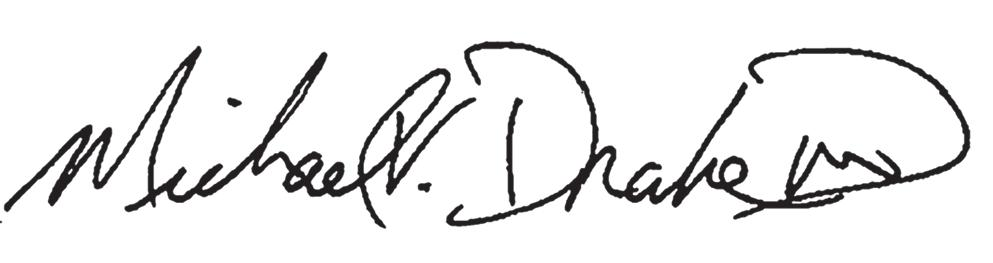
- Signature

Michael Vincent Drake (born July 9, 1950) is an American physician. He served as the 21st president of the University of California from August 2020 to August 2025, as the 15th president of Ohio State University from 2014 to 2020, and as the 5th chancellor of the University of California, Irvine from 2005 to 2014.

== Early life and education ==
Michael V. Drake was born in New York City and raised in Englewood, New Jersey, and Sacramento, California. He is the son of a doctor and a social worker. His mother graduated from East High School in Youngstown, Ohio, before attending college in Baltimore. The family lived in Baltimore, Nashville, Tennessee, New York, and New Jersey before settling in Northern California. He graduated from C.K. McClatchy High School in Sacramento, California in 1967. During college summers in the early 1970s, he worked at the original Tower Records.

Drake attended Sacramento City College from 1967 to 1969. He received a Bachelor of Arts from Stanford University in 1974 and a Doctor of Medicine and residency training from the University of California, San Francisco in 1975. He completed an Advanced Management Program at Harvard Business School in 2005.

== Career ==
Drake spent more than two decades on the faculty of the UCSF School of Medicine, ultimately becoming the Steven P. Shearing Professor of Ophthalmology and senior associate dean. He then served for five years as vice president for health affairs for the University of California system. From July 2005 to June 2014, Drake served as chancellor of the University of California, Irvine. He also served as a professor of ophthalmology (School of Medicine) and Education (School of Education).

=== UC Irvine ===
In 2005, Drake was appointed as the fifth chancellor of the University of California, Irvine (UCI). He officially began his term on July 1, 2005. His annual $350,000 salary remained unchanged from his previous position at the Office of the President. As of 2010 he earned $374,969.32.

=== Ohio State University ===
On January 30, 2014, the Ohio State University Board of Trustees named Drake as the 15th president of Ohio State University. He began his tenure at the university on June 30, 2014. At the time of his appointment, he was part of the American Academy of Arts and Sciences, the Institute of Medicine, and the board of directors of NCAA Division I.

In 2017, Dr. Drake led the establishment of the Ohio State Tuition Guarantee, which freezes tuition, mandatory fees, housing and dining for four years for incoming, in-state freshmen. He also increased the value of Ohio State Land Grant Opportunity Scholarships to cover the full cost of attendance while doubling the size of the program in 2018. In March 2015, Drake was appointed to the Rock and Roll Hall of Fame board in Ohio. In November 2019, the university announced that Drake would retire in 2020.

=== University of California ===
On July 7, 2020, Drake was selected as the 21st president of the University of California system, making him the first black president in UC's 152-year history. On July 31, 2024, Drake announced that he would step down from his role as President of the University of California at the conclusion of the 2024-2025 academic year with plans to join the University of California faculty thereafter.

== Personal life ==
Drake is married to Brenda Drake. An alumna of Stanford and Berkeley Law, Brenda Drake is an attorney and has served as a director or trustee of organizations focused on education, international health, finance, civil rights and the arts, including the National Urban League, City Arts & Lectures in San Francisco, San Francisco University High School and Golden Gate Bank. She is a director emerita and former board chair of Engender Health Inc., an international women's health organization, and is currently a trustee of the Berkeley Art Museum and Pacific Film Archive. Drake and his wife have two adult sons and four grandchildren.

Drake's first job was working at Tower Records. He is quoted as saying he has a "passion for music, which is still a hobby today". In 2015, Drake was appointed to the board of the Rock and Roll Hall of Fame and Museum, Inc. He has had a lifelong interest in music (notably rock and jazz), plays guitar, and teaches an undergraduate course on the music of the civil rights movement.

== Awards and honors ==
- In 2017, he and his wife, Brenda, were awarded the 10th Annual King Arts Legends & Legacies Award as well as the University of California-Irvine Medal, joining past honorees ranging from U.S. presidents to Ella Fitzgerald.
- Member of the Columbus Partnership
- Michael J. Hogan Award (laboratory science)

== Professional decisions ==
=== Chemerinsky firing and rehiring ===
Drake's first major firing scandal was to fire the Dean of the UCI law school, Erwin Chemerinsky. After Chemerinsky signed a contract on September 4, 2007, Drake rescinded the offer because he felt the law professor's commentaries were "polarizing"; Drake claimed the decision was his own and not the subject of any outside influence.

The action was criticized by both liberal and conservative scholars who felt it hindered the academic mission of the law school and violated principles of academic freedom. Few believed Drake's claims that it was not the result of outside influence. The issue was the subject of an editorial in The New York Times on September 14, 2007. Details emerged revealing that UCI had received criticism on the hire from the California Supreme Court's then-Chief Justice Ronald M. George, who criticized Chemerinsky's grasp of death penalty appeals, as well as a group of prominent local Republicans who wanted to stop the appointment, including Los Angeles County Supervisor Michael D. Antonovich. Drake traveled over a weekend to meet with Chemerinsky in Durham, North Carolina, where Chemerinsky was a professor at the Duke University School of Law at the time, and the two reached an agreement. On September 17, Chemerinsky issued a joint press release with Drake indicating that Chemerinsky would head the UCI law school. On September 20, 2007, Chemerinsky's hire was formally approved by the Regents of the University of California. In 2014, Chemerinsky said that he and Drake had since reconciled.

=== Waters firing ===
Drake fired Ohio State marching band director Jon Waters on July 24, 2014, after a university investigation found that the band's "sexualized culture" was "inconsistent with the University's values and Title IX requirements". The university stated that there were "serious cultural issues and an environment conducive to sexual harassment within the Marching Band", and that the band director "was aware or reasonably should have known about" it. Waters sued for reinstatement, accusing the university, Drake, and a provost of discriminating against him by disciplining him differently than a female employee and denying him due process. Drake has stood by his decision to terminate Waters as marching band director. As of January 2015, the university had spent nearly $1 million in defense of the decision and subsequent actions.

Academic offices
Preceded by Ralph Cicerone	Chancellor of the University of California, Irvine; 2005–2014	Succeeded by Howard Gillman
Preceded by E. Gordon Gee	President of Ohio State University; 2014–2020	Succeeded by Kristina M. Johnson
Preceded by Janet Napolitano	President of the University of California; 2020–2025	Succeeded by James Milliken
