= William Kirwan =

American academic administrator and mathematician (born 1938)

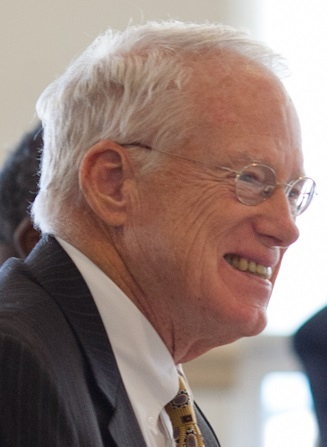
- Kirwan in 2012.

Chancellor of University System of Maryland
- In office August 1, 2002 – June 30, 2015
- Preceded by: Donald N. Langenberg
- Succeeded by: Robert Caret

12th President of Ohio State University
- In office July 1, 1998 – June 30, 2002
- Preceded by: John Richard Sisson
- Succeeded by: Edward H. Jennings

President of the University of Maryland, College Park
- In office February 1, 1989 – June 30, 1998; Acting: August 1, 1988–February 1, 1989
- Preceded by: John Brooks Slaughter (chancellor)
- Succeeded by: Gregory L. Geoffroy

Acting Chancellor of the University of Maryland, College Park
- In office August 1982 – November 1982
- Preceded by: Robert Gluckstern
- Succeeded by: John Brooks Slaughter

Personal details
- Born: William English Kirwan; April 14, 1938 (age 88) Louisville, Kentucky, U.S.
- Spouse: Patricia Harper (m. 1960)
- Children: 2
- Parent: Albert D. Kirwan (father)
- Education: University of Kentucky; Rutgers University
- Profession: Professor, university administrator, academic

William English "Brit" Kirwan (born April 14, 1938) is an American university administrator and mathematician who is chancellor emeritus of the University System of Maryland (USM) and professor emeritus of mathematics at the University of Maryland, College Park. Most recently, Kirwan served as chancellor of USM from 2002 to 2015. Previously, Kirwan worked at the University of Maryland, College Park from the 1960s to 1990s as a professor, administrator, and eventually president and was president of the Ohio State University from 1998 to 2002.

A native of Kentucky, Kirwan completed three degrees in mathematics, attending the University of Kentucky for his bachelor's degree and Rutgers University for his master's and doctorate degrees. Beginning in 1964, Kirwan was a mathematics professor at Maryland. After over 15 years on the faculty, including four years as head of the mathematics department, Kirwan joined Maryland's administration, beginning as chief academic officer in 1981. Kirwan had two stints as the interim president of the university in 1982 and 1988 before being formally elected by the board of regents as president in 1989, a position he would hold before leaving to become president of Ohio State University in 1998. Kirwan returned to Maryland in 2002 to serve as chancellor of the USM before retiring in 2015.

Kirwan also chaired the Knight Commission on Intercollegiate Athletics from 2007 to 2016. During his presidency, the NCAA implemented a recommendation from the Knight Commission to create financial incentives for member schools to improve student-athlete academic performance.

== Early life ==
The son of former University of Kentucky football coach and president Albert D. Kirwan, Kirwan was born in Louisville, Kentucky and raised in Lexington, Kentucky. He graduated from Henry Clay High School in Lexington in 1956.

After high school, Kirwan enrolled at the University of Kentucky on a football scholarship. He played one year on the freshman football team before leaving the sport to focus on his studies. A member of the Delta Tau Delta fraternity, Kirwan graduated from Kentucky in 1960 with an A.B. in mathematics. Kirwan later completed two graduate degrees in mathematics at Rutgers University, an M.S. in 1962 and Ph.D. in 1964. His doctoral thesis was Extremal Problems for Certain Classes of Analytic Functions, advised by Malcolm I.S. Robertson.

== Academic career ==
=== Early academic career (1963–1981) ===
While completing his Ph.D., Kirwan was an assistant instructor in mathematics at Rutgers University. Kirwan started at the University of Maryland, College Park in 1964 as an assistant professor of mathematics. In the 1966–67 school year, Kirwan was a visiting lecturer at Royal Holloway College, University of London. At Maryland, Kirwan was promoted to associate professor in 1968 and full professor in 1972; Kirwan would remain on the mathematics faculty until 1998.

From 1963 to 1992, Kirwan had 26 articles published in peer reviewed journals on topics such as real functions, bounded functions, and conformal maps. Kirwan co-edited the 1976 textbook Advances in Complex Analysis. From 1977 to 1981, Kirwan was chair of the Department of Mathematics.

=== Vice chancellor at University of Maryland, College Park (1981–1988) ===
Kirwan served as the chief academic officer at Maryland from 1981 to 1988, with the title of vice chancellor for academic affairs from 1981 to 1986, provost from 1986 to 1988, and vice president for academic affairs in 1988; From August to November 1982, Kirwan served as acting chancellor between the administrations of Robert Gluckstern and John Brooks Slaughter. As vice chancellor, Kirwan instituted stronger admissions standards, expanded undergraduate merit scholarships and graduate fellowships, and started a process for academic planning.

=== President of the University of Maryland, College Park (1988–1998) ===
After serving as acting president since August 1, 1988, Kirwan became president of the University of Maryland, College Park, on February 1, 1989, by a unanimous vote from the board of regents.

As president, Kirwan restructured the university's academic organization from one of divisions to schools and colleges. With budget cuts resulting from the early 1990s recession, Kirwan cut a college, seven departments, and 32 degrees from the university. Additionally during the Kirwan administration, the university had an increase in research dollars and one of the highest numbers of graduating students who were black.

=== President of Ohio State University (1998–2002) ===
On January 4, 1998, after E. Gordon Gee resigned to become president of Brown University, the Ohio State University Board of Trustees voted 17–0 to name Kirwan the 12th president of the university. Kirwan officially became president July 1 that year.

At Ohio State, Kirwan focused his attention on improving the academic standings during his tenure. He left Ohio State on June 30, 2002 to become chancellor of the University System of Maryland. His legacy of striving for diversity at Ohio State, lead to the Kirwan Institute for the Study of Race and Ethnicity being named after him.

=== Chancellor of the University System of Maryland (2002–2015) ===
Returning to Maryland, Kirwan accepted an offer on March 25, 2002, to become chancellor of the University System of Maryland (USM). Kirwan began as chancellor on August 1, 2002.

In 2009, he received the Carnegie Corporation Leadership Award, which included a $500,000 grant for academic programs. The following year, Kirwan won the 2010 TIAA-CREF Theodore M. Hesburgh Award for Leadership Excellence.

On May 13, 2014, Kirwan announced publicly that he would step down as USM chancellor after twelve years of service. As a tenured member of the Mathematics faculty at the University of Maryland, College Park, he will serve as the Regents Professor of Mathematics. Kirwan retired effective June 30, 2015, and was succeeded by Robert Caret. In October 2015, University of Maryland, College Park named its mathematics building William E. Kirwan Hall in Kirwan's honor.

== Other service ==
=== College athletics ===
Kirwan has also had executive-level positions relating to college athletics, including with the National Collegiate Athletic Association (NCAA). In addition to serving on the NCAA's Executive Committee and Committee on Agents and Amateurism, Kirwan chaired the NCAA Division I Board of Directors from 2000 to 2003. In May 2006, Kirwan joined the Knight Commission on Intercollegiate Athletics. From April 2007 to December 31, 2015, Knight co-chaired the Knight Commission; he served as sole chair for the entire 2016 calendar year before retiring.

In 2010, as the NCAA conference realignment was about to begin, the Knight Commission released a report calling on the NCAA and its member schools to reform their financial and academic practices. According to the report, from 2005 to 2008, spending on major college athletic programs increased by an average of 38 percent, compared to a growth of 20 percent for their colleges' academic spending. Kirwan stated: "There is every reason to believe that the direction the major programs are headed in will lead to further escalation in athletics spending and even greater imbalances in the fiscal priority for athletics over academics." The Knight Commission report made several recommendations:

- NCAA member schools should include more details comparing athletic and academic spending in financial reports that are filed with the NCAA.
- The NCAA should strengthen its Academic Progress Rate standard to give postseason bans following a single year's unsatisfactory score, in contrast to the NCAA's established standard of a three-year average,
- Schools with APR scores that reflect a graduation rate of 50 percent or more should get financial bonuses from the NCAA, drawn from NCAA Division I men's basketball tournament revenue.

Six years after the Knight report, the NCAA announced that beginning in 2019, it would give financial bonuses to schools based on student-athlete academic performance. The Knight Commission had been advocating such a system for the past 15 years; Kirwan called the NCAA's decision a "game-changing step to place a higher value on education in college athletics."

Interviewed by Gilbert M. Gaul for Gaul's 2015 book Billion-Dollar Ball: A Journey Through the Big-Money Culture of College Football, Kirwan said: "...the obsession with football is very corrupting to higher education." Reflecting on his presidency of Ohio State, Kirwan added: "The culture of football allegiance and reverence was disturbing. But nonetheless, because of it they can raise any amount of money they need to raise." However, Kirwan conceded "there is very little than presidents can do" because of what he called the "irresistible force" of college athletics.

=== Federal government advisory boards ===
Kirwan served on educational advisory boards to U.S. Presidents Bill Clinton and George W. Bush. President Clinton appointed Kirwan to the National Commission on Mathematics and Science Teaching for the 21st Century. In 2002, Kirwan was among 21 appointees by President Bush to the Board of Advisors on Historically Black Colleges and Universities.

Appointed by Speaker of the United States House of Representatives Nancy Pelosi, Kirwan served on the National Advisory Committee on Institutional Quality and Integrity (NACIQI) from 2010 to 2014. NACIQI advises the U.S. Secretary of Education on accreditation and certification for colleges and universities, and named chair of the College Board Advocacy and Policy Center Advisory Committee.

=== The Kirwan Commission ===
Kirwan served as chair of the Maryland Commission on Innovation and Excellence in Education, commonly known as the "Kirwan Commission." The commission was founded in 2016 to make recommendations to enable Maryland schools "to perform at the level of the world’s best school systems." In 2020, the Maryland General Assembly passed, and Governor Larry Hogan vetoed, a $4 billion proposal (once fully phased in) based on the commission's recommendations. The veto was overridden in February 2021.

=== Editorial and other boards ===
From 2004 to 2008, Kirwan served on the board of trustees of the Mathematical Sciences Research Institute.

In April 2007, Kirwan was appointed to the editorial board of the newly announced Journal of Diversity in Higher Education.

Kirwan is a past board chair of the National Association of State Universities and Land-Grant Colleges and of the American Council on Education. He is also a member of the CuriosityStream Advisory Board.

== Personal life ==
Kirwan's nickname, "Brit," was a play on his middle name English.

Kirwan married Patricia Harper in 1960. They have two children and three grandchildren.

Academic offices
Preceded by Robert Gluckstern	Chancellor of the University of Maryland, College Park acting 1982	Succeeded by John Brooks Slaughter
Preceded by John Brooks Slaughter as chancellor	President of the University of Maryland, College Park; 1989–1998	Succeeded by C. Daniel Mote Jr.
Preceded by John Richard Sisson acting	Ohio State University President; July 1, 1998 — June 30, 2002	Succeeded by Edward H. Jennings acting
