= Eric A. Walker (engineer) =

President of Pennsylvania State University

12th President of the Pennsylvania State University
- In office 1956–1970
- Preceded by: Milton S. Eisenhower
- Succeeded by: John W. Oswald

Personal details
- Born: April 29, 1910 Long Eaton, UK
- Died: February 17, 1995 (aged 84) State College, Pennsylvania, US
- Education: Harvard University

Eric Arthur Walker (April 29, 1910 – February 17, 1995) was president of the Pennsylvania State University from 1956 to 1970 and a founding member of the National Academy of Engineering.

== Biography ==
Born in Long Eaton, England, Dr. Walker earned a Bachelor's degree from Harvard University in Electrical Engineering, a master's degree in business administration, and doctorate in general science and engineering from Harvard.

Dr. Walker subsequently served as a professor and department head in the Electrical Engineering Departments at Tufts University and the University of Connecticut. In 1942, during World War II, Walker returned to Harvard as associate director of the Underwater Sound Laboratory, initially located at Harvard, but relocated to the campus of Penn State University in 1945. Dr. Walker remained at Penn State, becoming head of the Department of Electrical Engineering, then Dean of the College of Engineering and Architecture in 1951. Next Dr. Walker became vice president for research at Penn State in 1956, and President of the University, also in 1956.

Penn State experienced changes and growth during the Presidency of Dr. Walker. The post-war student population at the university increased from 13,000 to 40,000, becoming one of the largest universities in the United States. Dr. Walker also oversaw the creation of the Milton S. Hershey Medical Center, and research expenditures for the university grew from $8,000,000 in 1956-57 to $36,000,000 in 1969-70.

Dr. Walker served as Vice-Chair of President Eisenhower's Committee on Scientists and Engineers from 1956-1958.

== Legacy ==
The Eric A. Walker building on Penn State's campus is named in honor of Dr. Walker. It houses the Meteorology department, one of the larger science departments at the university, as well as the Geography department.
