= Erwin Chemerinsky =

American legal scholar (born 1953)

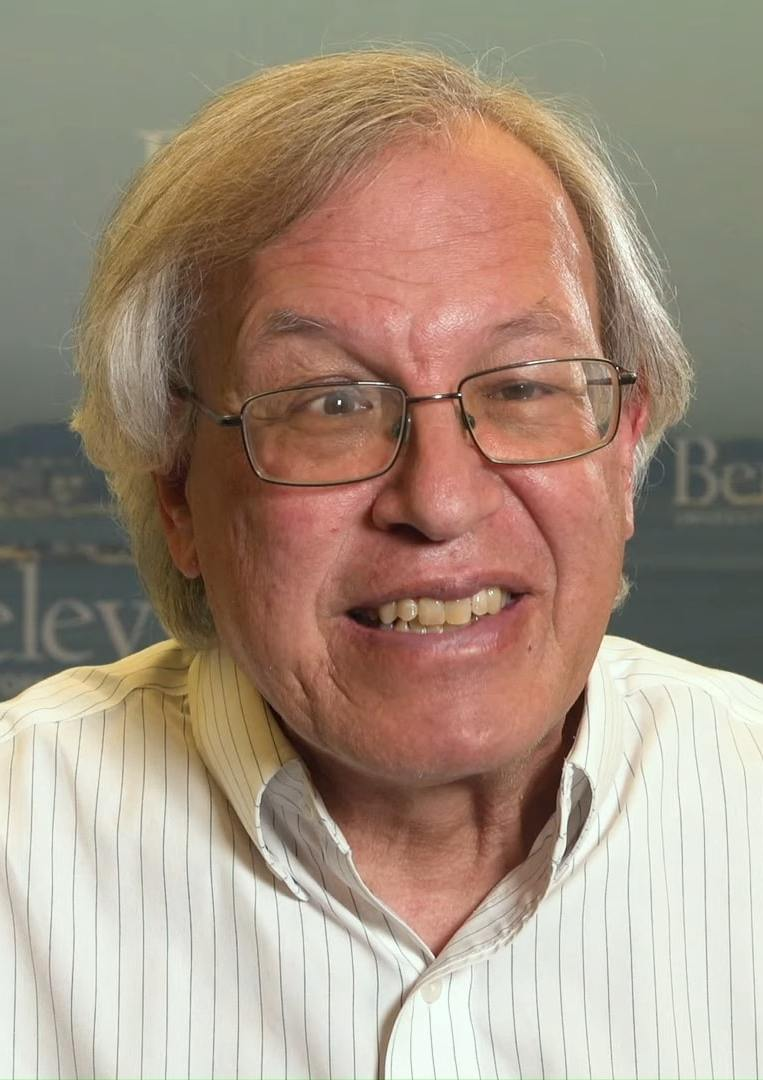
- Chemerinsky in 2020

13th Dean of University of California, Berkeley, School of Law
- Incumbent
- Assumed office July 1, 2017
- Preceded by: Melissa Murray

1st Dean of University of California, Irvine School of Law
- In office July 1, 2008 – July 1, 2017
- Succeeded by: L. Song Richardson

Personal details
- Born: May 14, 1953 (age 73) Chicago, Illinois, U.S.
- Education: Northwestern University (BS); Harvard University (JD)

Erwin Chemerinsky (born May 14, 1953) is an American legal scholar and author known for his studies of U.S. constitutional law and federal civil procedure. Since 2017, Chemerinsky has been the 13th dean of the UC Berkeley School of Law, replacing interim dean Melissa Murray. Previously, he was the founding dean of the University of California, Irvine School of Law from 2008 to 2017.

Chemerinsky was named a fellow of the American Academy of Arts and Sciences in 2016. National Jurist magazine named him the most influential person in legal education in the United States in 2017. In 2021 Chemerinsky was named president-elect of the Association of American Law Schools.

== Early life and education ==
Chemerinsky was born in 1953 in Chicago, Illinois. He grew up in a working-class Jewish family in the South Side of Chicago and attended the University of Chicago Laboratory Schools for high school.

He studied communications at Northwestern University, where he competed on the debate team. He graduated in 1975 with a Bachelor of Science. Chemerinsky then attended Harvard Law School, where he was a member of the Harvard Legal Aid Bureau. He graduated in 1978 with a Juris Doctor.

== Career ==
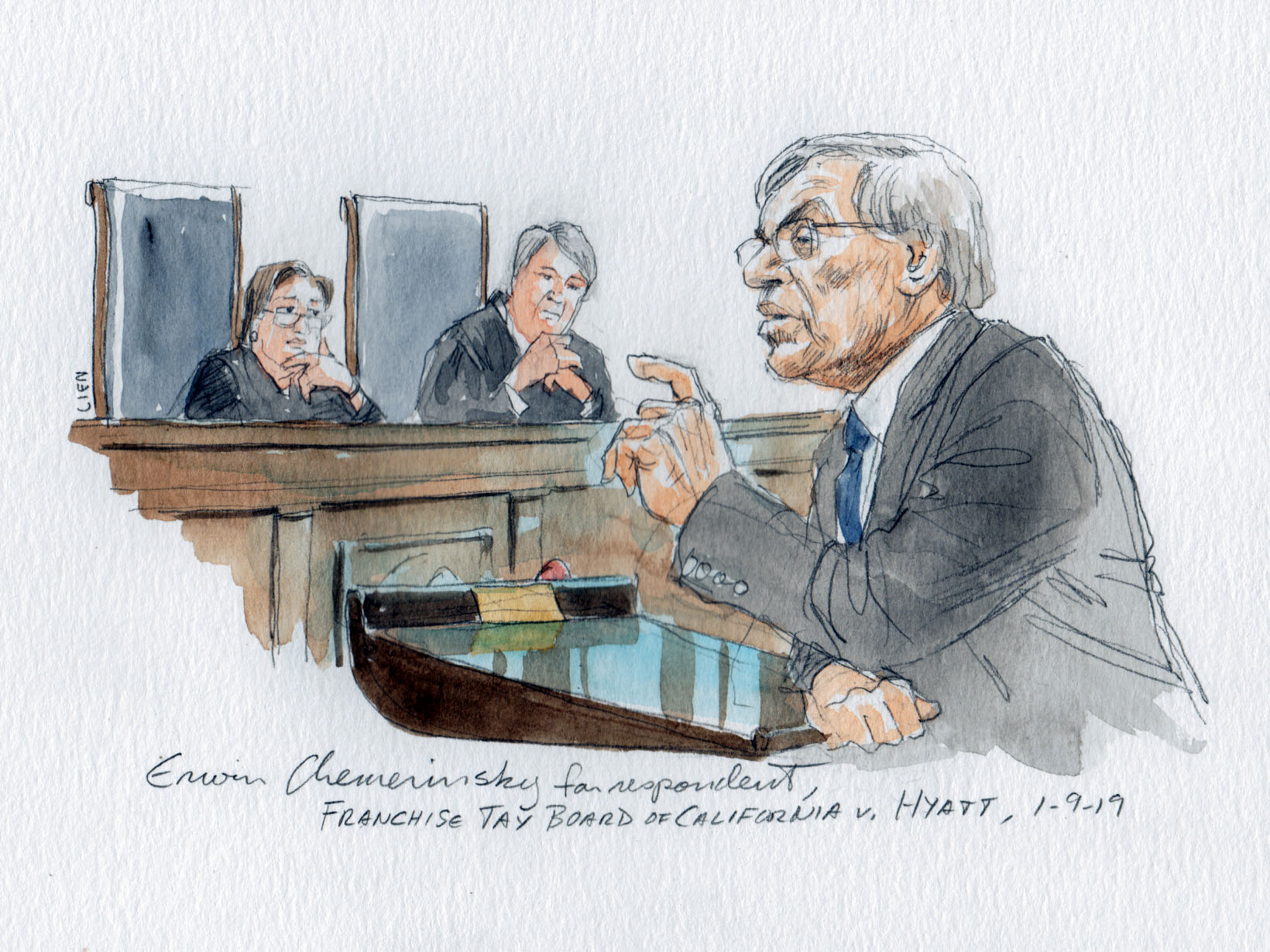
Courtroom sketch of Chemerinsky at a 2019 Supreme Court oral argument

After law school, Chemerinsky worked as an honors attorney in the Civil Division of the U.S. Department of Justice from 1978 to 1979, then entered private practice at the Washington, D.C., law firm Dobrovir, Oakes & Gebhardt. In 1980, Chemerinsky was hired as an assistant professor of law at DePaul University College of Law. He moved to the Gould School of Law at the University of Southern California (USC) in 1983. Chemerinsky taught at USC from 1983 to 2004, then joined the faculty of Duke University School of Law from 2004 to 2008.

In 1995, Chemerinsky provided commentary on the murder trial of O. J. Simpson for KCBS-TV, KNX, and CBS News. He assisted in drafting the Constitution of Belarus and was a founding member of the Progressive Jewish Alliance. He served on a panel within the Los Angeles Police Department tasked with investigating the Rampart scandal, and participated in a commission examining irregularities in city contracting processes. He played a role in drafting the Los Angeles city charter.

In 2008, Chemerinsky was named the inaugural dean of the newly established University of California, Irvine School of Law. In 2017, he became dean of the UC Berkeley School of Law, where he is also the Jesse H. Choper Distinguished Professor of Law.

As of November 2022, Chemerinsky has authored sixteen books, including a constitutional law textbook, and over two hundred law review articles. He also writes a regular column for The Sacramento Bee and monthly columns for the ABA Journal and Los Angeles Daily Journal, and frequently pens op-eds for prominent newspapers across the country. Chemerinsky has also argued several cases at the United States Supreme Court, including United States v. Apel, Scheidler v. National Organization for Women, Lockyer v. Andrade, and Van Orden v. Perry, and has written numerous amicus briefs.

In 2011, National Jurist magazine described Chemerinsky one of the "23 Law Profs to Take Before You Die".

He is the co-chair of the UC Free Speech Center's National Advisory Board. He was appointed to Los Angeles District Attorney George Gascón's transition team in 2020. He was the president of the Association of American Law Schools for the term spanning 2021–2022.

== Legal thought ==
Chemerinsky supports gun control and disagreed with the decision in District of Columbia v. Heller. He thinks that even if an individual's right to bear arms exists, the District of Columbia was justified in restricting that right because it believed that the law would lessen violence. George Will responded to Chemerinsky's argument in a column that ran four days later.

Chemerinsky believes that Roe v. Wade was correctly decided. He says: "Judicial activism is the label for the decision that people don't like." He also believed that gay marriage should be legal many years prior to the decision in Obergefell v. Hodges.

Chemerinsky also represents a client held at the Guantanamo Bay detention camp. He supports affirmative action. In January 2017, Chemerinsky, along with other high-profile lawyers, sued President Donald Trump for refusing to "divest from his businesses".

In an opinion piece following the 2020 presidential election, Chemerinsky wrote that "the Electoral College makes no sense as a way for a democracy to choose a president" and that it was intentionally designed to be anti-democratic and came about as part of "compromises concerning slavery that were at the core of the Constitution's drafting and ratification."

In a New York Times op-ed in August 2021, Chemerinsky argued that California's recall process is unconstitutional. This process called for a two-part ballot, with a yes-no question on whether to remove the governor from office, and then second question to select the candidate to replace the governor, with the governors name absent from that ballot. Chemerinsky argued that a governor receiving just below 50% support in the first question could be removed and replaced by a candidate receiving a much smaller plurality in the second question. This would replace a sitting governor with a candidate that received fewer votes than they did in the same election. Chemerinsky wrote: "[The court] could simply add Mr. Newsom’s name on the ballot to the list of those running to replace him. That simple change would treat his supporters equally to others and ensure that if he gets more votes than any other candidate, he will stay in office".

=== Freedom of speech ===
In 2010 at UC Irvine, Muslim Student Union-associated students protested against the college's invitation of Israeli ambassador Michael Oren, interrupting his speech multiple times, leading to the Irvine 11 Controversy. Chemerinsky, then UCI School of Law Dean, asserted that their protest was not protected by the First Amendment, referencing heckler's veto, but he also strongly criticized the prosecutors' decision to file criminal charges against the students.

In October 2023, one week into the Gaza war, more than 200 Berkeley Law alumni signed an open letter asking Chemerinsky, as dean, to "take immediate action to stand up for free discourse on social justice and equality at Berkeley Law, and to protect the students" who they felt had been targeted by a recent Wall Street Journal op-ed by Berkeley Law colleague Steven Davidoff Solomon titled "Don’t Hire My Anti-Semitic Law Students." Chemerinsky originally defended the right of law school clubs to bar Zionist speakers, even though he said he found the bylaw "troubling". Chemerinsky responded to the letter by saying that Solomon's op-ed was free speech, while also noting that Solomon expressed a personal opinion and did not speak for the law school.

Later that October, Chemerinsky wrote a Los Angeles Times op-ed, titled "Nothing has prepared me for the antisemitism I see on college campuses now". He referenced an Instagram post from a Berkeley law student incorrectly claiming that Chermerinsky had "taken an indefinite sabbatical from Berkeley Law to join the I.D.F.”, noting that several other students had suggested he was part of a ‘Zionist conspiracy”, and that one student recently told him at a town hall that she would feel safer in the law school if they would, "get rid of the Zionists.” He called on fellow university administrators to "denounce the celebrations of Hamas and the blatant antisemitism that is being voiced", noting that student group Students for Justice in Palestine had called the October 7 attacks a “historic win for the Palestinian resistance”. He also wrote a call to "mourn the loss of life in Israel and in Gaza", saying: "I strongly oppose the policies of the Netanyahu government, favor full rights for Palestinians, and believe that there must be a two-state solution."

In April 2024, a Berkeley law student and co-president of Berkeley's chapter of Students for Justice in Palestine interrupted an invitation-only dinner for 60 graduating law students held at Chemerinsky's home by using a microphone to give a speech about Ramadan and Palestine. The student group had called for a boycott of the dinner. They circulated a cartoon showing the dean holding a fork and knife covered in blood with blood around his mouth and saying, "No dinner with Zionist Chem while Gaza starves." Upon seeing the posters, Chemerinsky said that, "though deeply offensive, they were speech protected by the First Amendment." Students present described several protestors speaking for three to four minutes while Chemerinsky and his wife Catherine Fisk, also a UC Berkeley professor, asked them to leave their home. At that point, Fisk approached the student with the microphone and put her arm around the student apparently in an attempt to take the microphone. In a video, Fisk said: “We agree with you about what’s going on in Palestine." Eventually, 10 students left the property. The students claimed that they had a First Amendment right to protest at the professors' home, which was described as a wrongful interpretation of the First Amendment by the professors and multiple legal experts since the First Amendment does not include the right to protest inside of others' private homes. After the student accused Fisk of discrimination and harassment, UC Berkeley opened a civil rights investigation into the incident.

== Hiring controversy ==
Chemerinsky's hiring as dean of the UCI School of Law was controversial. After signing a contract on September 4, 2007, the hire was rescinded by UCI Chancellor Michael V. Drake, who felt that Chemerinsky's commentaries were "polarizing." Drake claimed the decision was his own and not the subject of any outside influence.

The action was criticized by both liberal and conservative scholars, who felt it hindered the academic mission of the law school and violated principles of academic freedom, and few believed Drake's claims that it was not the result of outside influence. The issue was the subject of an editorial in The New York Times on September 14, 2007. Details emerged revealing that the university had received criticism on the hire from the California Supreme Court's Chief Justice Ronald M. George, who criticized Chemerinsky's grasp of death penalty appeals, and a group of prominent local Republicans, including Los Angeles County Supervisor Michael D. Antonovich, who wanted to stop the appointment. Drake traveled to meet with Chemerinsky in Durham, North Carolina, where the latter was a professor at the Duke University School of Law at the time, and the two reached an agreement.

On September 17, Chemerinsky issued a joint press release with Drake indicating that Chemerinsky would head the law school. The release stated that the chancellor was "commit[ted] to academic freedom." On September 20, 2007, Chemerinsky's hire was formally approved by the Regents of the University of California.

== Personal life ==
Chemerinsky was first married to Marcy Strauss, a professor at Loyola Law School. They had two sons, Jeffrey and Adam, before divorcing in 1992.

Chemerinsky later married Catherine Fisk, the Barbara Nachtrieb Armstrong Professor of Law at UC Berkeley School of Law. They have a son, Alex, and a daughter, Mara.

== Selected works ==
=== Books ===
- Chemerinsky, Erwin (1987). Interpreting the Constitution. New York: Praeger Publishers. ISBN 978-0-275-92674-8.
- — (1989). Federal Jurisdiction. Boston: Little, Brown & Co.
  - 2nd edition (1994); 3rd edition (1999); 4th edition (2003), Aspen Publishers; 5th edition (2007); 6th edition (2012), Wolters Kluwer; 7th edition (2016); 8th edition (2020).
- — (1997). Constitutional Law: Principles and Policies. New York: Aspen Law and Business.
  - 2nd edition (2002); 3rd edition (2006); 4th edition (2011); 5th edition (2015), Wolters Kluwer; 6th edition (2019), Aspen Publishers; 7th edition (2023).
- — (2005). Constitutional Law (2nd ed.). New York: Aspen Publishers.
  - 3rd edition (2009); 4th edition (2013); 5th edition (2017).
- — (2008). Enhancing Government: Federalism for the 21st Century. Stanford University Press. ISBN 978-0-8047-5199-5.
- — (2011). The Conservative Assault on the Constitution. New York: Simon & Schuster. ISBN 978-1-4165-7467-5.
- — (2014). The Case Against the Supreme Court. New York: Viking. ISBN 978-0-670-02642-5.
- — (2018). We the People: A Progressive Reading of the Constitution for the Twenty-First Century. New York: Picador. ISBN 9781250166005.
- — (2022). Worse Than Nothing: The Dangerous Fallacy of Originalism. Yale University Press. ISBN 978-0-300-26848-5.
- — (2022). Criminal Procedure: Adjudication (4th ed.). Aspen Publishers. ISBN 978-1-5438-4609-6.
- — (2024). No Democracy Lasts Forever: How the Constitution Threatens the United States. Liveright. ISBN 978-1-324-09159-2.

=== Articles ===
- Chemerinsky, Erwin (1983). "In Defense of Equality: A Reply to Professor Westen". Michigan Law Review. 81 (4): 575–99. JSTOR 1288510.
- — (1985). "Rethinking State Action". Northwestern University Law Review. 80 (3): 503–57.
- — (1988). "Parity Reconsidered: Defining a Role for the Federal Judiciary". UCLA Law Review. 36 (2): 233–328.
- — (1989). "The Supreme Court, 1988 Term — Foreword: The Vanishing Constitution". Harvard Law Review. 103 (1): 43–104. doi:10.2307/1341408. JSTOR 1341408.
- — (1994). "Cases Under the Guarantee Clause Should Be Justiciable". University of Colorado Law Review. 65 (4): 849–80.
- — (1995). "The Values of Federalism". Florida Law Review. 47 (4): 499–540.
- —; Fisk, Catherine (1997). "The Filibuster". Stanford Law Review. 49 (2): 181–254. doi:10.2307/1229297. JSTOR 1229297.
- — (1999). "Substantive Due Process". Touro Law Review. 15 (4): 1501–34.
- — (2000). "Content Neutrality as a Central Problem of Freedom of Speech: Problems in the Supreme Court's Application". Southern California Law Review. 74 (1): 49–64.
- — (2001). "Against Sovereign Immunity". Stanford Law Review. 53 (5): 1201–24. doi:10.2307/1229540. JSTOR 1229540.
- — (2003). "The Segregation and Resegregation of American Public Education: The Court's Role". North Carolina Law Review. 81 (4): 1597–1622.
- —; Roberts, John C. (2003). "Entrenchment of Ordinary Legislation: A Reply to Professors Posner and Vermeule". California Law Review. 91 (6): 1773–1820. doi:10.2307/3481403. JSTOR 3481403.
- —; Jones, Trina; Barnes, Mario L. (2010). "A Post-Race Equal Protection?". Georgetown Law Journal. 98 (4): 967–1004.
- —; Barnes, Mario L. (2011). "The Once and Future Equal Protection Doctrine". Connecticut Law Review. 43 (4): 1059–88.
- —; Forman, Jolene; Hopper, Allen; Kamin, Sam (2015). "Cooperative Federalism and Marijuana Regulation" (PDF). UCLA Law Review. 62 (1): 74–122.
