= Student activities and traditions at UC Irvine =

The University of California, Irvine has a number of student activities and traditions.

== Shared governance ==
UCI has separate student governments representing undergraduate and graduate students. The Associated Students of the University of California, Irvine (ASUCI) is the undergraduate student government. The Associated Graduate Students (AGS) represents graduate students. ASUCI has executive, legislative, and judicial branches, and is also a member of the United States Student Association. In 2014, after a referendum creating a self-governing territory, ASUCI withdrew from the University of California Student Association.

Many student organizations are funded by ASUCI's Student Programming Funding Board. ASUCI also sponsors annual concerts and festivals, including "Shocktoberfest", "Wayzgoose", "Summerlands", and "Soulstice".

Other committees, such as the Student Fee Advisory Committee, provide for shared governance in certain areas of university administration, Many of these, such as the Student Center Board of Advisors, the Bren Events Center Advisory Board, and the Anteater Recreation Center Advisory Board were created to oversee campus entities funded by student-initiated referendums fees.

== Student media ==
=== The New University ===
The New University
- Type: Weekly student newspaper
- Format: Online
- School: University of California, Irvine
- Founded: September 23, 1968
- Headquarters: University of California, Irvine, C114 Student Center, Irvine, California, United States 92697
- Website: newuniversity.org

The New University (New U) is the official student newspaper of UC Irvine. As of the 2022-23 academic year, it is published throughout the year online, and in print once per quarter. The paper's editorial staff consists of UCI undergraduates. The next year's editor-in-chief is elected early in the spring quarter by a vote of the current year's editorial board; the elected editor-in-chief then selects the next year's editorial board.

The newspaper is an official department of the university, housed under the university's Student Government & Student Media department, but receives minimal funding from the school. The newspaper's freedom of the press is legally guaranteed by California's Leonard Law, which was amended in 2006 to include public higher education institutions. Unlike many college newspapers, the New University has no faculty advisor and is not formally tied to any academic program.

=== KUCI ===
KUCI is the official student-run radio station at UC Irvine.

== On-campus activities ==
The Anteater Recreation Center (ARC) is a gym on campus established by a student fee initiative. Members may opt to participate in fee-based courses in martial arts, team sports, SCUBA diving, sailing, and more. Additionally, club sports are open for all ARC members to join, such as badminton, ice hockey, lacrosse, roller hockey, rugby, sailing, volleyball, etc. .

The Student Center and Cross-Cultural Center are central locations for many student activities and resource centers. A recent student center expansion project will expand the existing facility to 300,000 square feet (28,000 m^{2}). Two new food courts, a large ballroom, a clock tower, and several conference centers and stores are among the additions. The UCI Student Center has undergone four phases over the past 30 years. Phase I was when the student center was first established in 1981. This included a bookstore, restaurant, music room, small game room, a few study areas, and two conference rooms. Phase II occurred when another study lounge, food unit and 300-seat multipurpose room was built a year later. In 1990, Phase III led to the student center being expanded with a larger bookstore, more study and lounge space, a new game room, an expanded food area, Crystal Cove Auditorium, and more meeting rooms. The Cross-Cultural Center was also opened during this time with meeting rooms, Student Umbrella Organization offices, and study and lounge space. From 2007-2009, the Student Center underwent Phase IV of its latest reconstruction developments with now triple the amount of space for conference and meeting areas along with a multipurpose room and large ballroom. Study space areas have also increased making it available for both individuals and small study groups. There are also two new dining areas with seating areas indoors and outdoors along with a permanent performance area in the student center terrace. The Cross Cultural Center also had new developments as it is now double in size providing a large multipurpose room and additional conference and office space.

== Traditions ==
Annual traditions include "SPOP", an orientation program for new students and their parents; and Welcome Week.

== Student activism ==
Events featuring controversial guest speakers (such as John Yoo and Viet Dinh, co-authors of the USA Patriot Act who appeared for separate lecture events) have been known to attract large crowds of demonstrators.

Some major recent and ongoing activism efforts include support for demands to increase wages and benefits for campus labor unions, support for Tagalog and Filipino Studies (TAPS), awareness for the situation in Israel-Palestine by Students for Justice in Palestine and Anteaters for Israel, awareness for the crisis in Darfur, protests against the conflict in Iraq, ASUCI-sponsored political debates, and lectures sponsored by the Muslim Student Union.

== Controversies ==
=== Flag controversy ===
In March 2015, the legislative branch of ASUCI voted in favor of a resolution that would have banned all flags from a shared inner workroom in the undergraduate student government's offices. The text of the resolution stated in part that "The American flag has been flown in instances of colonialism and imperialism" and that "freedom of speech, in a space that aims to be as inclusive as possible, can be interpreted as hate speech".

After the student government's president expressed his opposition to the resolution in a public social media post, the resolution became controversial, with criticism and support from students and non-students. The student representatives who voted in favor of the ban experienced intense harassment and received numerous death threats.

The university administration called the ban "misguided", stating “The views of a handful of students passing a resolution do not represent the opinions of the nearly 30,000 students on this campus, and have no influence on the policies and practices of the university”, and the executive branch of the student council vetoed the ban.

During the controversy, California State Senator Janet Nguyen said that the state constitution could be amended to prohibit the banning of the American flag at taxpayer-funded campuses.

Numerous professors and students from universities across the state signed a letter of support for the students who passed the resolution, written in response to increasing hostility, death threats, and racial slurs.

UC Irvine Chancellor Howard Gillman initially called the vote "outrageous and indefensible", and stated that the campus would install additional flagpoles. After criticism from students, faculty and others, however, Gillman published a conciliatory op-ed in the Los Angeles Times, urging a stop to the harassment of students and stating that criticism of the United States flag "is a feature of university life and a measure of a free society."

=== Film screening protest ===
On May 18, 2016, Anteaters for Israel and Students Supporting Israel hosted a screening of the film Beneath the Helmet at UC Irvine (UCI) with Israeli soldiers who were to be holding a panel discussion. Up to 50 members of Students for Justice in Palestine (SJP) and other campus groups wanted to participate in the panel discussion. They were refused by the organizers so they staged a protest outside instead. Following the protest, the protestors were accused of improper conduct. The day after, Howard Gillman, chancellor at UCI, issued a statement strongly condemning the protestors that he claimed had "crossed the line of civility" and he claimed that they had disrupted the screening and blocked exit paths and that the attendees had called the police.

Over the next few days, claims spread in media such that the protestors had banged at the door and the windows of the room where the screening took place, had shouted obscenities, had blocked students from entering the room and had tried to push open the door to get inside the room. One student, Eliana Kopley, described how the protestors would not let her enter the room when attempting to leave. She found herself separated from the other Jewish students, physically blocked from joining them, and chased by the protesters as she sought to escape. When Kopley eventually managed to leave the building, three protesters followed after her until she fled to safety. During the incident Kopley was forced to hide in a kitchen while a UCI staff member protected her.

Pro-Israel groups such as the Orange County Hillel chapter, the Zionist Organization of America and the Brandeis Center got involved in the case which caused the school's Office of Student Conduct to launch an investigation. The investigation resulted in a 58-page report which cleared the protestors of most of the allegations. The report did not find evidence of any student being chased nor of anyone banging on the door or the windows. Julie Hartle, a student representative from the National Lawyers Guild, who was present at the protest dismissed the accusations as lies. However, the investigation found that SJP, the group that organized and led the protest, violated student conduct policies regarding disruption because the protest was too loud. The sanctions imposed on the group were a warning and an assignment to host an educational program.

=== Muslim Student Union ===
In 2010, students of UCI's Muslim Student Union (MSU), who became known as the Irvine 11, staged a protest against Israeli U.S. ambassador Michael Oren's visit to campus by disrupting it. During his speech, the students shouted, among other things, "Michael Oren, propagating murder is not an expression of free speech." UCI found that the MSU was involved in the protest and suspended it for one academic quarter, followed by two years of probation and sentenced it to 100 hours of university-approved community service. Criminal charges were brought against the students and they were found guilty of misdemeanors. The prosecution of the Irvine 11 was met with condemnation by members of the academic community and civil rights groups. Legal scholars warned about the chilling effect that it could have, arguing that it was an example of selective prosecution, although Law professor Alan Dershowitz defended the prosecution as both legally sound and necessary.

In 2004, the Zionist Organization of America (ZOA) filed a complaint with the Education Department's Office for Civil Rights (OCR) alleging that Jewish students were harassed and subjected to a hostile environment at UCI. Among the charges pertaining to the MSU were that it sponsored an annual "Zionist Awareness Week" (Note: The title of the event changed from year to year.) which, according to ZOA, featured anti-Semitic speakers. Following a three-year-long investigation, the OCR failed to substantiate any of the allegations. The OCR concluded that the speeches were about opposition to Israeli policies and not to the religious or national affiliation of Jewish students. A local group associated with David Horowitz's Freedom Center, dissatisfied with the result of the investigation, released their own report lambasting the MSU.

== See also ==
- KUCI
- Irvine Review
- Orange County Great Park
