= Heckler's veto =

Censorship excused as preventing a future negative reaction

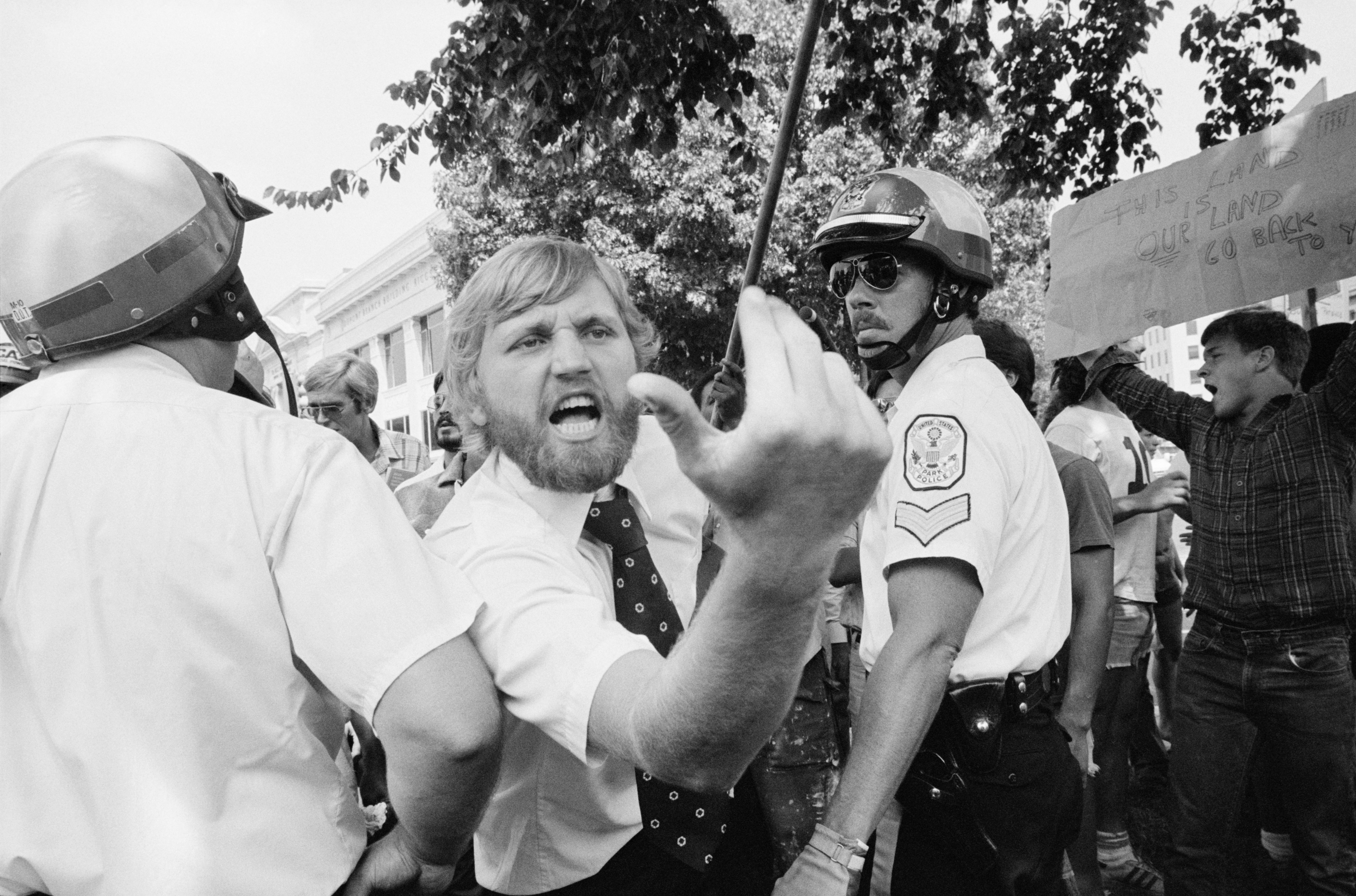
A heckler in Washington, D.C. leans across a police line toward a demonstration of Iranians during the Iran hostage crisis, August 1980.

In discourse, a heckler's veto is a situation in which a party who disagrees with a speaker's message is able to unilaterally trigger events that result in the speaker being silenced. For example, a heckler can disrupt a speech to the point that the speech is canceled.

In the legal sense, a heckler's veto occurs when the speaker's right is curtailed or restricted by the government in order to prevent a reacting party's behavior. The common example is the termination of a speech or demonstration in the interest of maintaining the public peace based on the anticipated negative reaction of someone opposed to that speech or demonstration.

The term heckler's veto was coined by University of Chicago professor of law Harry Kalven in 1965. Colloquially, the concept is invoked in situations where hecklers or demonstrators silence a speaker without intervention of the law.

== Legal basis and precedent ==
In United States case law, the legal underpinning of the heckler's veto is mixed. Most findings say that the acting party's actions cannot be pre-emptively stopped due to fear of heckling by the reacting party, but in the immediate face of violence, authorities can force the acting party to cease their action in order to satisfy the hecklers.

The best known case involving the heckler's veto is probably Feiner v. New York, handed down by the Supreme Court in 1951. Chief Justice Fred M. Vinson, writing for the majority, held that police officers acted within their power in arresting a speaker if the arrest was "motivated solely by a proper concern for the preservation of order and protection of the general welfare". 340 U.S. 315.

In Gregory v. Chicago (1969), Justice Hugo Black, in a concurring opinion, argued that arresting demonstrators as a consequence of unruly behavior of by-standers would amount to a heckler's veto.

In Hill v. Colorado (2000), the Supreme Court ruled that a law which forbade protesters from approaching within eight feet of a person without their consent was not a heckler's veto. Since the protesters could easily convey their message across that gap, the effect of the law was not to prevent speech but to prevent physical harassment. However, the court would not uphold a law which "allowed a single, private actor to unilaterally silence a speaker even as to willing listeners". For example, in Schenck v. Pro-Choice Network of Western New York (1997) it struck down a provision which would require anti-abortion protesters "either to stop talking or to get off the sidewalk whenever a patient came within 15 feet".

University of California, Irvine Law School Dean Erwin Chemerinsky invoked the concept in an editorial following a protest in 2010, in which students disrupted a speech by the Israeli ambassador Michael Oren. Chemerinsky explained that broad freedom exists to invite speakers and hold demonstrations, but that once a speaker has begun an invited lecture,

Freedom of speech, on campuses and elsewhere, is rendered meaningless if speakers can be shouted down by those who disagree. The law is well established that the government can act to prevent a heckler’s veto – to prevent the reaction of the audience from silencing the speaker. There is simply no 1st Amendment right to go into an auditorium and prevent a speaker from being heard, no matter who the speaker is or how strongly one disagrees with his or her message.

The Assistant Deputy District Attorney, Dan Wagner, who brought criminal charges against the protestors, known as the Irvine 11 controversey, similarly argued that the protest amounted to a heckler's veto. Ultimately, ten of the students were convicted of one misdemeanor count of conspiring to disrupt Oren's speech and one student for disrupting it. Each of them was sentenced to 56 hours of community service, three years of probation and fined.

In a concurring opinion to Mahanoy Area School District v. B.L. (2021) dealing with regulation of off-campus student speech, Justice Samuel Alito likened the ability of schools attempting to punish students for speaking out against the school as a form of a heckler's veto.

== Outside the court system ==
Heckler's veto is often referred to outside a strict legal context. One example is a 2006 article by Nat Hentoff in which he claims that "First Amendment law is clear that everyone has the right to picket a speaker, and to go inside the hall and heckle him or her—but not to drown out the speaker, let alone rush the stage and stop the speech before it starts. That's called the 'heckler's veto'."

In Hentoff's formulation, the heckler themself is the party which directly carries out the "veto" and suppresses speech. This runs counter to the legal meaning of the phrase:

Note that, to a lawyer familiar with the First Amendment law, the phrase "heckler's veto" means something different than the plain English interpretation of the words suggests. In First Amendment law, a heckler's veto is the suppression of speech by the government, because of [the possibility of] a violent reaction by hecklers. It is the government that vetoes the speech, because of the reaction of the heckler. Under the First Amendment, this kind of heckler's veto is unconstitutional.

— Ronald B. Standler

In 2008, Michigan State University professor of political science William B. Allen has used the phrase "verbal terrorism" to refer to the same phenomenon, defining it as "calculated assault characterized by loud side-conversations, shouted interruptions, jabbered false facts, threats and personal insults".

== See also ==
- Cancel culture
- Feiner v. New York
- Fricke v. Lynch
- Gregory v. City of Chicago
- National Socialist Party of America v. Village of Skokie
