= No Democracy Lasts Forever =

2024 non-fiction book

- Author: Erwin Chemerinsky
- Subject: Democracy in America
- Publication date: 2024-08-20
- Pages: 240
- ISBN: 9781324091585

No Democracy Lasts Forever: How the Constitution Threatens the United States is a nonfiction book by Erwin Chemerinsky, published by Liveright/Norton. It contains criticism of the Constitution of the United States.

Chemerinsky argues that the constitution is outdated and that as of writing it is difficult to enact changes that are necessary for society. He further argues that a new constitution should be written.

== Reception ==
Thomas Karel of the Library Journal wrote that the book benefits from the author's knowledge of the subject.

Reviewer Louis Menand stated that he felt some of the arguments the book made are faulty, and he criticized it as "repetitive and hastily written".

Samuel Goldman of The Wall Street Journal stated that the book's lack of a full definition of democracy makes it difficult to quantify its premise.

Kirkus Reviews stated that the work has "Depressing yet important insights".
