= Gregory v. City of Chicago =

Gregory v. Chicago
- Supreme Court of the United States

Argued December 10, 1968 Decided March 10, 1969
- Full case name: Dick Gregory, et al. v. City of Chicago
- Citations: 394 U.S. 111 (more) 89 S. Ct. 946; 22 L. Ed. 2d 134; 1969 U.S. LEXIS 2295

Case history
- Prior: Certiorari to the Supreme Court of Illinois, 39 Ill. 2d 47, 233 N.E.2d 422 (1968)

Holding
- Gregory and others were improperly convicted of disorderly conduct based on the disorderly behavior of bystanders to their First Amendment-protected demonstration.

Court membership
- Chief Justice Earl Warren Associate Justices Hugo Black · William O. Douglas; John M. Harlan II · William J. Brennan Jr. Potter Stewart · Byron White; Abe Fortas · Thurgood Marshall

Case opinions
- Majority: Warren, joined unanimously
- Concurrence: Black, joined by Douglas
- Concurrence: Harlan

Laws applied
- U.S. Const. amends. I, XIV

Gregory v. Chicago, 394 U.S. 111 (1969), was a United States Supreme Court case in which the Court overturned the disorderly conduct charges against Dick Gregory and others for peaceful demonstrations in Chicago.

== Background ==
Social activists, including comedian Dick Gregory, protested against school segregation in Chicago, Illinois. Twelve years earlier, in Brown v. Board of Education, the U.S. Supreme Court ruled school segregation unconstitutional. The protesters marched from Chicago's city hall to the mayor's residence in the neighborhood of Bridgeport. After the march concluded, white bystanders began to act unruly and heckle the protesters; when they could not contain the hecklers' activity, police asked the protesters to disperse. The protesters did not disperse and were consequently arrested, and subsequently convicted by a jury, of violating Chicago's disorderly conduct ordinance. The protesters appealed to the Illinois Supreme Court. That court upheld their conviction, holding that the protesters' refusal to obey the police order justified the convictions. Aided by the ACLU, the protesters appealed to the US Supreme Court.

== Opinion of the Court ==
The US Supreme Court, in a unanimous decision, overturned the conviction for several reasons:

- "Petitioners were denied due process since there was no evidence to support their convictions"
- "The convictions were for demonstrating, not for refusing to obey police orders."
- "The trial judge's charge allowed the jury to convict for acts protected by the First Amendment. Stromberg v. California"

Justice Hugo Black, in a concurring opinion, argued that arresting demonstrators as a consequence of unruly behavior of bystanders would amount to a "heckler's veto."

== See also ==
- List of United States Supreme Court cases, volume 394
- Stromberg v. California, 283 U.S. 359
