= Wayzgoose =

Entertainment given by a master printer to his workmen

A wayzgoose (or wayz-goose, waygoose or wayzegoose) was at one time an entertainment given by a master printer to his workmen each year on or about St Bartholomew's Day (24 August). It marked the traditional end of summer and the start of the season of working by candlelight. Later, the word came to refer to an annual outing and dinner for the staff of a printing works or the printers on a newspaper.

In modern times, the tradition has been adopted by large publishing and educational sales companies in the United States.

== Possible derivations ==
The derivation of the term is doubtful. It may be a misspelling for "waysgoose", from wase, Middle English for "sheaf", thus meaning "sheaf" or "harvest goose", a bird eaten at harvest-time, cf. the "stubble-goose" mentioned by Chaucer in The Cook's Prologue.

The most likely origin is the word "Weg(s)huis", which was current in early Modern Dutch. This word (literally, "way house") was one of several words meaning the English "inn" and was figuratively used for "a banquet". The Low Country origin of the word "wayzgoose" has never seriously been disputed by etymologists, seeing that much early chapel terminology was borrowed from Low Country printers by their English apprentices (and later journeymen). The variety of spellings and pronunciations (including with and without the "z") indicate that it is an orally-borrowed Dutch word that fit somewhat uneasily in the mouth of English speakers.

Another plausible origin is a more general word for a merry making or feast, reputedly referring to the grand goose-feast annually held at Waes, in Brabant, at Martinmas. However that is pronounced quite differently, as "Waas". It apparently means "cloud-veil" in Dutch: also there are no places called Waes or Waas in Brabant, but there are several places with "Waes" in their name in East Flanders.

Relations between England and the Low Countries were often very close, and it is plausible that such entertainments might have grown to be called colloquially a "Waes-Goose". It is not clear why the term should have survived later in the printing trade. Certainly the goose has long ago parted company with the printers' wayzgoose, which was usually held in July, though it had no fixed season. A keepsake was often printed to commemorate the occasion. It could be printed ahead of time, or the printing could form part of the evening's activities.

Some bookbinders believe that Wayzgoose was held on St Bartholomew's Day because he was the patron saint of leather workers. It was no coincidence that on 24 August 1456 the printing of the Gutenberg Bible was completed, perhaps triggering the very first wayzgoose party at Fust–Schöffer shop in Mainz.

The holiday, a break in printing, was traditionally also the day that paper makers took a break from making paper for the printers, and used up the last of the pulp to make paper for windows, waxed paper being the traditional window material for the yeoman class before the use of glass became more widespread, and after this was done, the pulp vats would be cleaned out for the new fiber, made from rags collected in the spring, and retted (prepared by rotting) over the summer.

The paper windows were fitted on St. Martin's Day (11 November). Just as the saint had supposedly cut his cloak in half to share with a beggar during a snowstorm, so yeoman farmers would give off cuts of the windows to the poor, to help them keep warm during the coming winter.

Parchment was the original medieval material for keeping northern homes warm for those who could not afford glass for the windows. The patron saint of parchment makers was also St Bartholomew. With paper replacing parchment, the name of the traditional Martinmas party, the Wayzgoose, might have been transferred to both paper makers' and printers' parties.

== Contemporary uses ==
Since 1979, the Grimsby, Ontario Public Art Gallery has held its annual Wayzgoose festival showing handmade books and paper arts and demonstrating their technologies. The festival occurs on the last Saturday in April. The wayzgoose is held in the Grimsby Art Gallery. The town produces a limited edition anthology showing samples of the work by private presses and celebrating print media and book arts across Canada and internationally. In addition to publishers with displays at the fair, the anthology includes the work of private presses that cannot come to Grimsby for the event. The usual edition is 115 copies. To celebrate its 35th anniversary, the gallery published a two-volume anthology in an edition of 135 copies.

For almost 20 years the Letterpress Guild of New England has met in late September for their annual Wayzgoose.

In 2009, Coach House Books, an independent Canadian press, began hosting an annual Wayzgoose Party, in celebration of buying the building which they had rented since 1965.

The University of California, Irvine's student government (ASUCI) hosts a medieval fair called Wayzgoose every April for an open house event known as Celebrate UCI.

Minnesota Center for Book Arts, a contemporary art center preserving traditional printing and bookmaking crafts, celebrates an annual Wayzgoose in appreciation of its donors and members.

Tacoma, Washington holds an annual Wayzgoose event dubbed a "printer's celebration". This event, which includes a large-scale relief printing project using a steamroller, is designed to get the community interested and involved in the art of printmaking. The School of Visual Concepts in Seattle, Washington also celebrates an annual Wayzgoose festival which includes a "Steamroller Smackdown" competition.

The Hamilton Wood Type and Printing Museum in Two Rivers, Wisconsin holds a Wayzgoose in November. The event is a multi-day conference with presentations and workshops by letterpress printers and historians.

The Museum of Printing (in Armidale, New South Wales, Australia) held its first Wimble's Wayzgoose on 28–30 April 2017. It is named after the FT Wimble & Co. Collection which is housed at the museum.

The Ann Arbor District Library in Ann Arbor, MI hosted their inaugural Wayzgoose & Printing Festival in 2018. It is now an annual event with lectures, exhibits, vendors, learning workshops, and a tour around town.

The Amalgamated Printers' Association, founded in 1958, has held an annual Wayzgoose since 1961, in a different American city every year. The 2024 Capital Wayzgoose was held in Washington, D.C., and the 2025 Daredevil Wayzgoose (named after daredevil Sam Patch) was held in Rochester, N.Y. Each multi-day Wayzgoose consists of workshops on letterpress printing, paper marbling, graphics, stationery, tours, and related printing projects, in various sites across the area.

== Cultural references ==
Wharfedale Wayzgoose is the name of a Border Morris side (team of Morris dancers) from Otley, West Yorkshire, a town renowned for the development of the Wharfedale printing press.

In 1928, South African poet Roy Campbell wrote a satirical poem, The Wayzgoose, about racism in South Africa.

In 1978 a children's sketch comedy TV show entitled Wayzgoose was produced and screened for the Australian Broadcasting Corporation. The series ran for about ten half-hour episodes.
