= KUCI =

Radio station at the University of California, Irvine

- Irvine, California; United States
- Broadcast area: Los Angeles area
- Frequency: 88.9 MHz
- Branding: Radio Free Orange County

Programming
- Format: Variety, College radio
- Affiliations: UC Radio Network

Ownership
- Owner: Regents of the University of California

History
- First air date: October 16, 1969; 56 years ago

Technical information
- Facility ID: 55570
- Class: A
- ERP: 200 watts
- HAAT: -3 meters
- Transmitter coordinates: 33°38′41.00″N 117°50′36.00″W

Links
- Webcast: Listen live
- Website: www.kuci.org

KUCI (88.9 FM) is a student-run college radio station licensed to the University of California, Irvine in Irvine, California. The station is owned by the Regents of the University of California.

KUCI broadcasts a free-form format. Besides Irvine, the station serves Santa Ana, Newport Beach, and other parts of Orange County in Southern California. Located near the university's Science Library and the Humanities Interim Classroom Facility, KUCI is the county's only independent radio station.

== Background ==
Originally a student-run pirate radio station in 1968 only reaching a few miles from the UCI campus, KUCI broadcast taped music from a dormitory on campus. The tapes were made by Richard Privette, and the broadcast equipment was assembled by an engineering student named Craig Will. Shortly after, there was a nightly live music and talk show called Unreal Radio, with Lee Sailer and Zack Zenor, from Sailer's dormitory room.

KUCI became legal after it was forced to officially register with the Federal Communications Commission (FCC) following a crack-down on illegal radio broadcasts in 1969. The legalization of the station was undertaken by Craig Will. 1969 was the first year that KUCI received funding from the Associated Students of UCI (ASUCI), which filed an application to register the station with the Federal Communications Commission. Will, unable to continue the process due to a wound from radiation testing and under the burden of his schoolwork, handed the project to Earl Arbuckle, who continued the work.

On October 16, 1969, the FCC granted KUCI Program Test Authority to broadcast on 89.9 MHz. The studio at the time was inside a small closet in the Physical Science Building. Evening-only broadcasts featured records from the disc jockey's own collection. The first song ever played on KUCI was "Sugar, Sugar" by the Archies.

In the spring of 1971, construction began on the third floor of UCI's Gateway Commons for studio and office space. By the fall of 1971, KUCI moved for the first time. At this time, the station's music library consisted of 400 records. In January 1975, KUCI's management decided to establish a 24-hour schedule.

In 1981, KCRW, a station sharing the same frequency as KUCI, received permission from the FCC to relocate their antenna and boost their power. KUCI's signal was dampened to a few hundred yards. KUCI quickly applied for a new frequency, but the government lost the paperwork. After protests and petitions by staff, students, and community members, KUCI received permission to change their frequency to 88.9 fm, where it continues to broadcast. It shares this frequency with another low-power college station, KXLU, which broadcasts from Loyola Marymount University in West Los Angeles, California.

Almost ten years later and after the filing of many applications, KUCI acquired the right to raise the power from 25 watts mono. On April 23, 1993, KUCI became a 200-watt stereo station and played "Sugar, Sugar" again to celebrate the event. In 1993, UC Irvine's management was ready to tear down Gateway Common's walls for earthquake retrofitting. In the summer of 1994, KUCI moved its entire operations to the temporary building called Humanities Annex, home to the Center for Gender Education.

KUCI has benefited from its proximity to the Los Angeles music scene, with notable performances and visits from many up-and-coming artists such as X, Red Hot Chili Peppers, No Doubt, Social Distortion, Jack Johnson, and the Dead Milkmen.

KUCI airs an extensive schedule of the UC Irvine Anteaters, including all of the men's basketball games and most of the women's basketball and baseball games.

== See also ==
- Campus radio
- List of college radio stations in the United States
