= Power, Faith and Fantasy =

2007 book by Michael Oren

Power, Faith, and Fantasy: America in the Middle East: 1776 to the Present
- Author: Michael Oren
- Language: English
- Genre: History
- Publisher: W.W. Norton & Co.
- Publication date: 2007
- Publication place: United States
- ISBN: 0-393-33030-3

Power, Faith, and Fantasy: America in the Middle East: 1776 to the Present, a history of American involvement in the Middle East by Michael Oren, was published by W.W. Norton & Co. in 2007 and quickly became a New York Times bestseller.

The Power in the title refers to the United States' military, diplomatic and financial strength to pursue its interests in the Middle East. Faith, in the words of Oren, refers to "impact of religion in the shaping of American attitudes and policies toward the Middle East." And fantasy refers to the image Americans themselves shaped of the Middle East.

The audiobook version is performed by Norman Dietz.

== Thesis ==
In Oren's narrative, the present resembles the past. The new American republic was immediately forced to formulate a Middle East policy, and the issues were not very different from the issues America faces in the Middle East today.

In Oren's own words: "[Contemporary] American policy- makers, it will be shown, wrestled with many of the same challenges in the area faced by their ... predecessors and similarly strove to reconcile their strategic and ideological interests. Mythic images of the Middle East, meanwhile, remained a mainstay of American popular culture. ... The objective [of this final section] is to enable Americans to read about the fighting in Iraq and hear the echoes of the Barbary wars and Operation Torch [the code name for the American landing in North Africa in World War II] or to follow presidential efforts to mediate between Palestinians and Israelis and see the shadows of Teddy Roosevelt and Woodrow Wilson."

Hillel Halkin, writing in Commentary, finds one aspect of this thesis compelling. He argues, with Oren, that the role of idealism in American foreign policy may be unique. "America alone (or so it can be claimed), in addition to pursuing, sometimes ruthlessly, its national interests like any other country, has frequently acted with the best interests of others in mind. One can compile a long list of major American foreign-policy decisions, by no means all of them regarding the Middle East—entering World War I, the Marshall Plan, intervening in Bosnia and Kosovo, etc.—that arguably had, alongside their purely pragmatic calculations, a genuine element of idealism, without which it would have been difficult, if not impossible, to obtain support for them from the American public. More than the citizens of other democracies, Americans really do expect their governments to be a force for good in the world."
