= Steven Davidoff Solomon =

Steven Davidoff Solomon (aka Steven M. Davidoff) is an expert on corporate law, an academic, and a journalist. He currently works as a UC Berkeley law professor and as a columnist for The Wire China.

He has had nine solo and co-authored works selected as one of the top 10 articles of the year by Corporate Practice Commentator. He has also authored and edited several books, including Gods at War, The Corporate Contract in Changing Times, Law and Economics of Mergers and Acquisitions, Mergers and Acquisitions, and Research Handbook on Mergers and Acquisitions.

He is retained by the U.S. Department of Justice as an expert legal adviser to its Task Force to Combat Antisemitism. He co-founded the Antisemitism Education Initiative at UC Berkeley with fellow professor Ethan Katz and Berkeley Hillel Executive Director Adam Naftalin-Kelman, in partnership with the UC Berkeley Chancellor's Committee on Jewish Life and Campus Climate, the Center for Jewish Studies, the Helen Diller Institute for Jewish Law and Israel Studies, Berkeley Hillel, and the Magnes Collection of Jewish Art & Life.

== Education and career ==
Solomon completed a BA at University of Pennsylvania, an MFin at the London Business School, and a JD at Columbia University. Prior to joining UC Berkeley, Solomon taught at Ohio State University, University of Connecticut, and Wayne State University. He wrote for the New York Times Dealbook column for over a decade. Before his academic career, he practiced as a corporate attorney for Shearman & Sterling in New York and London, and with Freshfields Bruckhaus Deringer in London.

== "Don't Hire My Anti-Semitic Law Students" article ==
In October 2023, one week into the Israel–Hamas war, Solomon wrote a Wall Street Journal op-ed titled "Don't Hire My Anti-Semitic Law Students." Solomon's article referenced the fact that Berkeley law students in 2022 led 12 student groups in adopting a bylaw that banned any speaker from campus who "expressed and continued to hold views or host/sponsor/promote events in support of Zionism, the apartheid state of Israel, and the occupation of Palestine." Solomon asserted that this and other "student conduct at Berkeley is part of the broader attitude against Jews on university campuses that made last week's massacre possible." He encouraged potential employers to ask their applicants "if they support discriminatory bylaws or other acts and resolutions blaming Jews and Israelis for the Hamas massacre."

The article sparked controversy among UC Berkeley law students. Some called for him to be fired. That same week, more than 200 Berkeley Law alumni signed an open letter asking UC Berkeley's law school dean Erwin Chemerinsky to "take immediate action to stand up for free discourse on social justice and equality at Berkeley Law, and to protect the students," who they felt had been targeted by the article. The alumni letter argued that Solomon's article called "for employers to reject students seeking to advocate for human rights harm free speech." Dean Chemerinsky responded that Solomon's op-ed was free speech, while also noting that Solomon expressed a personal opinion and did not speak for the law school. UC Berkeley Professor and chair of the Palestinian and Arab Studies Program, Ussama Makdisi, vilified the article on X.

== "Mr. Trump, Investigate My Campus" article ==
On February 2, 2025, Solomon wrote another op-ed for the Wall Street Journal titled "Mr. Trump, Investigate My Campus." Citing the previous week's executive order from President Trump called "Additional Measures to Combat Anti-Semitism", he called for an investigation of incidents of antisemitism at UC Berkeley, citing a campus lecture that he said included Hamas rape denial.

UC Berkeley was at this time already being investigated by the U.S. House Committee on Education and the Workforce. On February 3, 2025, the day following Solomon's article, the U.S. Department of Education announced an extension of that investigation, citing "almost no discipline for antisemitic violations" following the 2024 inquiry.

On February, 5, UC Berkeley's Chancellor Rich Lyons responded with his own op-ed, also in the WSJ, titled "No Need to Investigate My Campus, Mr. Trump." He clarifies that the lecture in question was optional for students. He also says that, though he does not object to Solomon "criticizing anyone who denies what Hamas was responsible for on Oct. 7, 2023," academic freedom and free speech prevent campus intervention in preventing events like the lecture referenced.

Both op-eds were criticized by another UC Berkeley law professor, Ty Alper, in his own March 15 op-ed in the Daily Cal, a student-run newspaper, arguing that the school "must protect the right of all invited speakers to speak, regardless of the content of their speech," and that Solomon's article "should be met with unequivocal condemnation and a commitment to zealously fight any effort to punish political speech on campus."
