= Worse Than Nothing =

2022 book by Erwin Chemerinsky

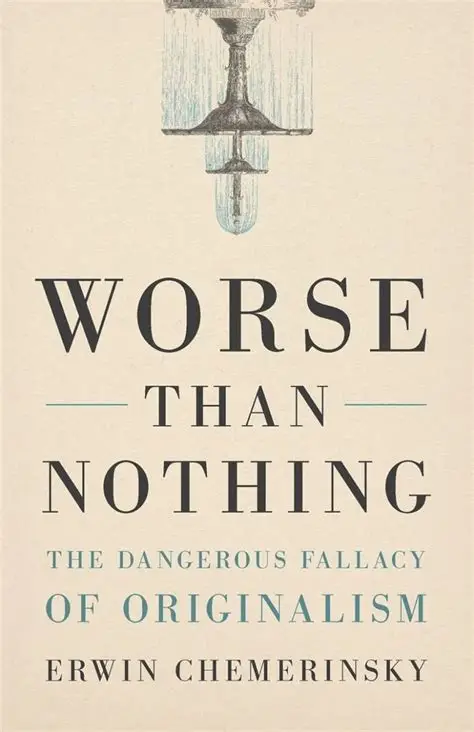
Worse Than Nothing: The Dangerous Fallacy of Originalism (2022)

Worse Than Nothing: The Dangerous Fallacy of Originalism is a non-fiction book by Erwin Chemerinsky, published in 2022 by Yale University Press. It discusses developments in the United States Supreme Court and the U.S. Constitution in the early 21st Century.

He criticized the concept of originalism, arguing that people doing originalism were inconsistent with it, that originalism does not work in newer time periods, that the Founding Fathers themselves did not use it, and that it causes problems in society. Adam J. White of the Wall Street Journal wrote that the author "has long been one of the most pointed critics of originalism—and of originalist justices."

The book specifically criticizes the positions of Amy Coney Barrett.

== Reception ==
Stephen Rohde of the Los Angeles Review of Books described the work as "timely and devastating", and that the author is "eminently qualified" in the subject.

Adam J. White of The Wall Street Journal stated that the criticisms of the positions of Coney Barrett are "possibly the most misguided".

David Cole in The New York Review of Books, said that Chemerinsky "... offers a concise, point-by-point refutation of the theory [of originalism].

Kirkus Reviews stated that the book's argumentation is "Sensible".

== Summary ==
Erwin Chemerinsky's Worse Than Nothing: The Dangerous Fallacy of Originalism discuses and criticizes the theory of originalism, the perspective that a constitutional provision is fixed when once adopted.
