= Muslim Student Union of the University of California, Irvine =

Muslim student organization

Muslim Student Union
- Formation: 2001
- Location: University of California, Irvine, Irvine, California, United States
- Affiliations: Muslim Students Association
- Website: http://www.msuuci.com

The Muslim Student Union of the University of California, Irvine (MSU UCI, MSU, or Muslim Student Union) is a student organization at the University of California, Irvine (UCI) in Irvine, United States, and an affiliated chapter of the national Muslim Students' Association. Its self-declared mission is to create an open environment, to promote social awareness, to strengthen Islamic foundations, and to cater to the Muslim student community at UCI.

In 2010, the MSU was temporarily suspended by university officials, who found that the organization had deliberately disrupted a speech given on campus by then-Israeli ambassador to the United States Michael Oren during what became known as the Irvine 11 controversy.

== Activities and events ==
The MSU holds daily congregational prayers at least three times per day as well as weekly Friday prayers on campus. The MSU has held Islam Awareness Weeks and quarter-long events known as "Islam Awareness Quarter: Knowing the Strangers" to educate fellow students about Islam.

The MSU has participated in or hosted a number of fundraising events: in 2007, the MSU and UNICEF hosted "Invisible Children", a fundraiser and information event about the plight of Ugandan child soldiers; in 2008, it held "Fashion Fighting Famine: Darfur", a Muslim-inspired fashion-event, fundraising for the famine in Darfur in Sudan; in 2004, it raised $12,000 to the victims of the 2004 Indian Ocean earthquake and tsunami; and in 2010, it raised over $5,000 to the Haiti earthquake victims. The MSU has also raised money to the victims of hurricane Katrina.

In 2008 and 2009, the MSU was one of several campus groups that hosted the week-long "Gears of War" event that explored the Iraq war and U.S. imperialism. The event criticized UCI's support for U.S. foreign policy as well as sexism, racism, and worker exploitation. The week was co-hosted by the UCI Worker Student Alliance, Muslim Student Union, Amnesty International at UCI, Darfur Action Committee, Campaign for Consciousness, and Students for a Sensible Drug Policy.

In 2015, the MSU helped fund a "food pantry" on UCI using a $2,500 grant provided by the western branch of the Muslim Students Association. The food pantry would be used to provide food to students suffering from food insecurity. The idea behind the project was that "No student should ever have to worry about where their next meal is coming", according to one MSU member.

=== Israeli Apartheid Week ===
The MSU participates in the annual Israeli Apartheid Week, an international, week-long educational series, aiming to increase public understanding of the history of the Palestinians as well as the racial inequalities they experience and to build support for the BDS movement. Critics, such as the Anti-Defamation League, have alleged that the event is antisemitic and that the MSU has invited antisemitic speakers.

In May 2009, the MSU hosted a lecture series called "Israel: The Politics of Genocide", featuring presentations of former congresswoman Cynthia McKinney, Islamic activist Amir Abdel Malik Ali, and British parliamentarian George Galloway. It also screened the award-winning film Occupation 101. Critics called upon UCI Chancellor Michael V. Drake to condemn both the event and the MSU but he declined to do so. However, University of California's President, Mark Yudof, who is Jewish, condemned the event in a letter published on the pro-Israel website Scholars for Peace in the Middle East. In his opinion, "the title of the series is virulent, historically inaccurate, and offensive to Jewish people everywhere. For me to feel otherwise would be antithetical to my life and beliefs."

The MSU has invited a variety of speakers to their IAW events, among them, Professor Norman Finkelstein, Holocaust survivor Hedy Epstein, founder of Students for Justice in Palestine Professor Hatem Baizan, Professor Ilan Pappé, Rabbi Yisroel Dovid Weiss of Neturei Karta, and Alison Weir. In 2010, Malik Ali spoke. Roz Rothstein, CEO of the right-wing pro-Israel advocacy organization StandWithUs, was in the audience and, during the question-and-answer session, she asked him if he supported Hamas, Hezbollah and Islamic Jihad. Malik Ali answered affirmatively. Rothstein also asked if he supported "jihad on this campus" and Ali answered: "Jihad on this campus ...? As long as it's in the form of speaking truth to power, yes."

Soon after, a group of UCI faculty wrote an open letter in which they expressed concern over campus activities that foment "hatred against Jews and Israelis" and referred to statements made by the recently invited speakers. Drake condemned "the speaker's endorsement of terrorism." MSU responded in a letter to the editor in New University, stating that it joined him "in condemning terrorism", that it would not tolerate "the promotion of hatred against any particular group on the basis of their race, color, ethnicity or religion", and that it did not "endorse everything that our speakers say".

=== Irvine 11 controversy ===
In 2010, students of the union staged a protest against Israeli ambassador to the United States Michael Oren's visit to campus. During Oren's speech, the students, who became known as the Irvine 11, shouted, among other things, "Michael Oren, propagating murder is not an expression of free speech." UCI found that the MSU was implicated in organizing the protest and recommended suspending the union for one year, followed by another year of probation, as well as fifty hours of university-approved community service by its members, UCI reduced the suspension on appeal to a ban for an academic quarter, 100 hours of community service, and two years of probation. Criminal charges were brought against the students and they were found guilty of misdemeanors. The verdict was upheld on appeal. The prosecution of the Irvine 11 was met with condemnation by members of the academic community, the American Civil Liberties Union (ACLU), and numerous others. Legal scholars warned about the potential chilling effect that it could produce, arguing that it was an example of selective prosecution, although Law professor Alan Dershowitz defended the prosecution as both legally sound and necessary.

== Complaints by Zionist groups ==
MSU has been the target of a number of complaints filed by Zionist groups. In 2004, the Zionist Organization of America (ZOA) alleged that Muslim students at UCI who wore green stoles at their graduation ceremony were inciting terrorism against Jews and Israel. Fox News host Bill O'Reilly stated that the students were "signifying their support for the terrorist group Hamas and for suicide bombers". The text on the stoles read: "There is no God but Allah, and Muhammad is his messenger" and "God, increase my knowledge".

The same year, ZOA filed a complaint with the Education Department's Office for Civil Rights (OCR) alleging that Jewish students were harassed and subjected to a hostile environment at UCI. The charges pertaining to the MSU was that it had sponsored an annual "Zionist Awareness Week" (Note: The title of the event changed from year to year.) which, according to ZOA, featured antisemitic speakers, campus magazine articles, marches, and the erection of a temporary wall to symbolize the wall, or barrier, Israel has built in the West Bank. ZOA also claimed that a Jewish student had been pushed at an event sponsored by the MSU in 2006.

Following a three-year-long investigation, the OCR failed to substantiate any of the ZOA's 13 allegations and the MSU was cleared of any wrong-doing. The investigation concluded that the speeches were about opposition to Israeli policies and not to the religious or national affiliation of Jewish students. A local group associated with David Horowitz's David Horowitz Freedom Center, dissatisfied with the result of the investigation, released their own report lambasting the MSU.

ZOA appealed the OCR's decision to dismiss their complaint and a new investigation was initiated in 2008. One of the allegations were that the MSU had distributed flyers allegedly falsely attributing an anti-Israel statement to South Africa's former President Nelson Mandela and that it thus "disseminat[ed] false information that inflames hatred for Jews and Israel." After five years of deliberations, the OCR again dismissed the complaint in 2013 emphasizing that discrimination laws "restrict the exercise of expressive activities or speech that are protected under the First Amendment of the US Constitution," especially not "in the university environment where academic freedom fosters the robust exchange of ideas." ZOA's other complains were that the university discriminated against Jewish students by enforcing a no-camera rule for MSU-sponsored speakers and that UCI had failed to stop students from using the University trademark on t-shirts that read "UC Intifada: How you can help Palestine." These complaints were also dismissed.

During the MSU's Israeli Apartheid Week in 2007, a local self-proclaimed Zionist dressed up in a turban with his face covered, holding signs reading "Death to Infidels. Death to Israel". He claimed to have been spat on and to have received death threats, but later admitted to the police that he "embellished a bit" and said that spit from MSU students' mouths had landed on him when he argued with them.

After an event held in 2009, co-sponsored by the MSU and other student groups, featuring George Galloway during which funds were raised to his charity Viva Palestina, ZOA filed a complaint alleging that the funds were raised for Hamas. The university launched an investigation and Democratic Representative Brad Sherman joined in on the charges, writing that he believed that the investigation would confirm that the MSU had "solicited funds for a terrorist organization" and that it should be banned from campus. The allegations were unfounded and the MSU was cleared of any wrongdoing.

In 2016, the David Horowitz Freedom Center hung posters targeting members of MSU and Students for Justice in Palestine on campus. UCI denounced the campaign for creating an unsafe and intimidating environment for students. Horowitz maintained that his campaign was intended to prevent "on-campus BDS resolutions to boycott Israel's economy." Horowitz has previously claimed that MSU supports terrorism and is a part of Hamas.

== See also ==
- List of organizations that have endorsed the BDS movement
- Student activities and traditions at UC Irvine
