= Catherine Fisk =

American legal scholar

Catherine L. Fisk is an American legal scholar. She is the Barbara Nachtrieb Armstrong Professor of Law at the UC Berkeley School of Law. She was awarded the Littleton-Griswold Prize in American Law and Society by the American Historical Association in 2010.

She holds an AB summa cum laude from Princeton University and a JD from the University of California, Berkeley.

She is married to legal scholar Erwin Chemerinsky. Together they have a son and daughter.

== Books ==
- Working Knowledge: Employee Innovation and the Rise of Corporate Intellectual Property, 1800-1930 (University of North Carolina Press, 2009, 2014)
- Writing for Hire: Unions, Hollywood, and Madison Avenue (Harvard University Press, 2016)

Co-author

- Labor Law in the Contemporary Workplace (3d ed. 2019)
- The Legal Profession: Ethics in Contemporary Practice (2d ed. 2019)
- What Lawyers Do: Understanding the Many American Legal Practices (2020)
- Labor Law Stories (2005)
