= Irvine 11 controversy =

Legal saga involving students at UC Irvine

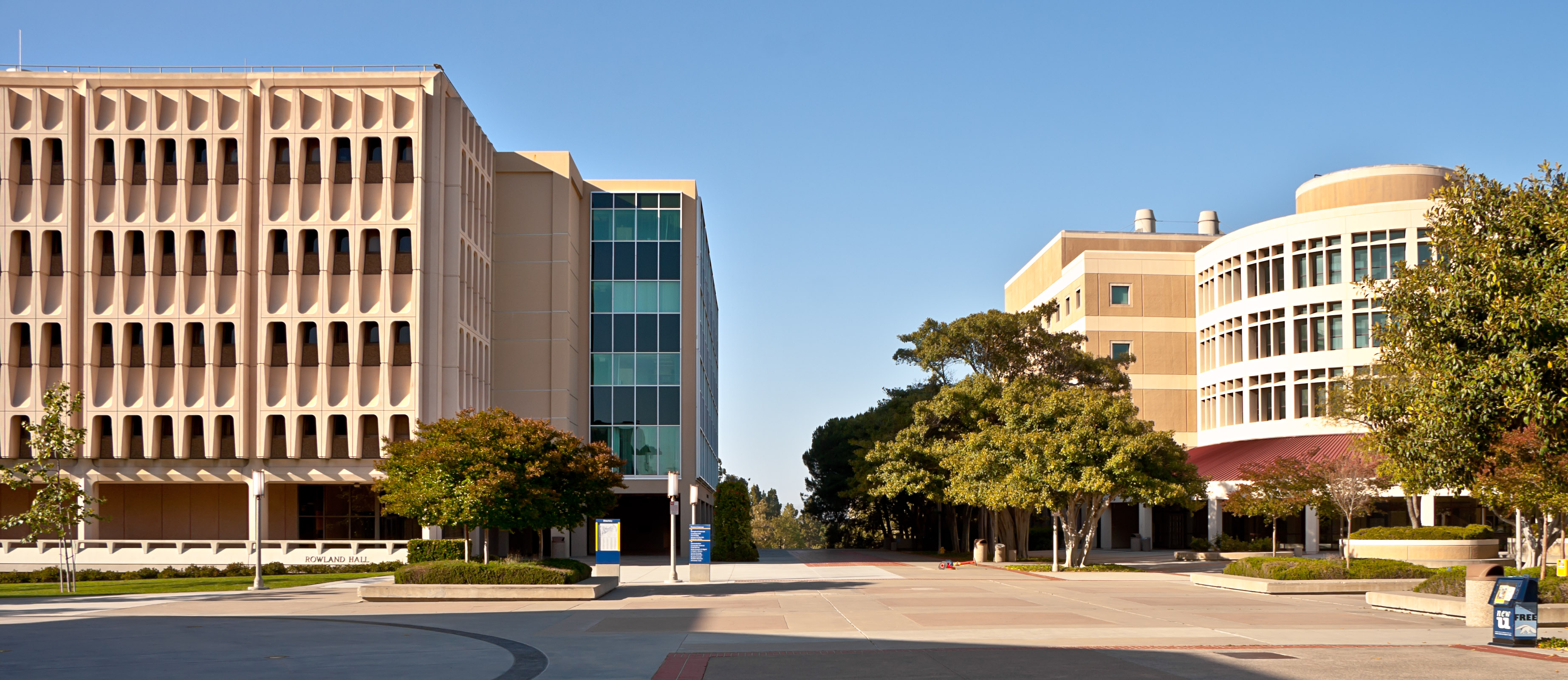
The Physical Sciences plaza and some of the main buildings at UCI

The Irvine 11 controversy was a legal saga that followed a protest staged by members of the University of California, Irvine, Muslim Student Union to disrupt and prevent a speech by Israel's ambassador Michael Oren at University of California, Irvine (UCI) in 2010. The students, and the students' union involved, the Muslim Student Union (MSU), were first disciplined by UCI for having disrupted the ambassador's address and were later also prosecuted and convicted of misdemeanor charges. The controversy led to a debate on whether the students' protest was First Amendment-protected free speech and whether filing criminal charges against them was fair after UCI had already disciplined them. Critics argued that the students were victims of selective prosecution and that they were targeted by Orange County District Attorney Tony Rackauckas because they were Muslims and supported the Palestinians.

== Planning ==
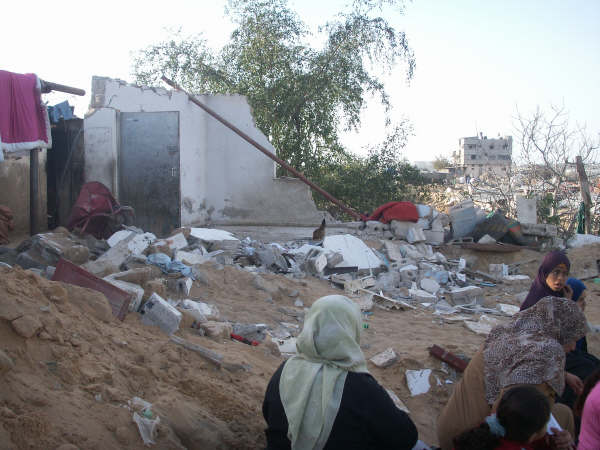
Destruction in Gaza was an impetus for the protest according to Osama Shabaik.

Months after the 2008-2009 Gaza war, UCI student Osama Shabaik visited Gaza to deliver medical aid. What Shabaik saw compelled him to "speak out" against Israel's destruction of Gaza. Shabaik and a group of peers consequently decided to stage a protest during an upcoming speech by Oren, to be held on February 8, 2010, at UCI. They were eleven students in total; three from UC Riverside and eight from UCI.

In interviews with Jonathan Alexander and Susan C. Jarratt, the MSU students described the process they went through as they discussed how to best protest Oren's visit. They found a video on YouTube showing audience members standing and interrupting former Israeli Prime Minister Ehud Olmert's speech at the University of Chicago some thirty times. They decided to imitate that tactic but without engaging in dialogue which they felt would be meaningless; as audience members they would be limited to asking Oren questions that he would easily divert. The intent was for the protest to be rude - one student put it: "You have to be rude sometimes, especially if you're dealing with systems of injustice."

== The protest ==
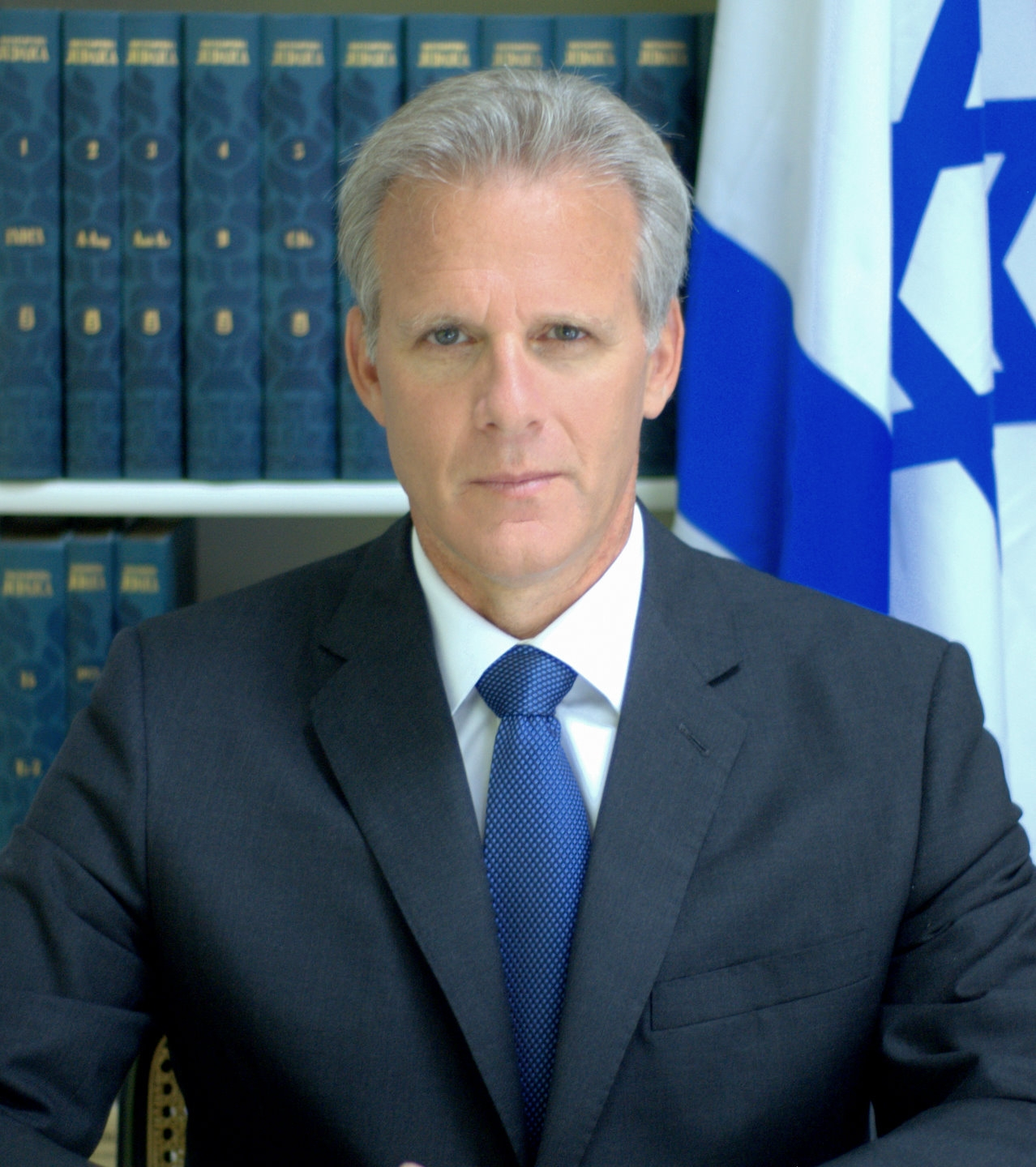
Michael Oren had his speech disrupted by protestors.

About 500 to 700 people had gathered in a packed auditorium to hear Oren. As he began speaking, 30 minutes late, Shabaik and his friends stood up one by one and shouted a statement that they read from an index card. Shabaik yelled "Michael Oren, propagating murder is not free speech!" followed by his friends who shouted "Michael Oren you are a war criminal!", "It's a shame this University has sponsored a mass murderer like yourself!", and "You, sir, are an accomplice to genocide!" Each statement was met with cheers from their supporters.

According to a video of the event, students continuously disputed the event, and after many interruptions and attempts by the UC faculty, the entire MSU staged a walkout, yelling and screaming at the audience.

According to a student protester who was forcibly removed from the event, each student yelled a statement, walked to a side of the room and was handcuffed and, without further incident, detained in a nearby room by campus police until after Oren had finished his speech.

Video of the event does not show students being handcuffed in the auditorium.

Threats by Oren's supporters were directed at them, according to the students. As police escorted the last student out, the students' supporters walked out, cheering and chanting as they were met by jeering from others in the audience.

The moderator of the event, Mark Petracca, said he had never experienced this kind of behavior in more than twenty years of teaching and that the protestors were embarrassing. At one point he yelled "Shame on you". Oren left the stage after the fourth disruption and UCI Chancellor Michael Drake intervened and lambasted the students for their disruptive behavior. Oren was persuaded to return to the stage 15 minutes later and, though he was disrupted six more times, finished his speech. He did, however, cancel the planned 30-minute question and answer session.

Earlier in the day, the MSU had issued a press release both strongly condemning Oren's invitation to speech at campus and labeling him a war criminal:

The members of the Muslim Student Union at the University of California, Irvine, condemn and strongly oppose the presence of Michael Oren on our campus today. We resent that the Law School and the Political Science Department have agreed to cosponsor a public figure who represents a state that continues to commit human rights violations, thereby breaking international law and law of Israeli accord. ... As people of conscience, we oppose Michael Oren’s invitation to our campus. Propagating murder is not a responsible expression of free speech. Oren and his partners should only be granted a speakers platform in the International Criminal Court and should not be honored on our campus.

Shortly after the protest, the students were charged with section 403 of the UCIPD's penal code - disrupting a public event on university property - and UCI initiated a disciplinary process against the students from their university. A Facebook group with over 3,000 members was set up which called for all charges against them to be dropped. Jewish groups called for UCI to crack down on the protestors.

Erwin Chemerinsky, dean of the UCI School of Law, asserted that their protest was a form of civil disobedience, not First Amendment-protected free speech and argued that they should be punished by the university, but not so severely as to ruin their educational careers.

An MSU spokesperson said that the union wasn't officially involved in the protest, and that the students were "acting on their individual accord", but leaked emails later showed that the union had helped organize the protest.

== Suspension by the university ==
In spring 2010, UCI recommended suspending the MSU who it stated was guilty of disorderly conduct, obstructing university activities, and providing false information about its role in organizing the protest. Members of the union would also have to collectively complete 50 hours of university-approved community service. It was the first time in recent memory that a student group was suspended for protesting.

Chemerinsky supported UCI's suspension of the MSU, and local Jewish groups applauded it as a victory against hate speech. As did Israeli Consul General Jacob Dayan, who accused the MSU of spreading hate and suppressing free speech.

Fifteen American civil rights and professional bar associations, including the National Lawyers Guild, the Center for Constitutional Rights, the Jewish Voice for Peace, American Muslims for Palestine, the Asian Law Caucus, and the American-Arab Anti-Discrimination Committee, sent an open letter to Chancellor Michael Drake condemning the suspension. They argued that, since students have a long history of disrupting speeches without seeing the type of severe punishment now being considered by the UCI, it was engaging in disparate treatment - a form of discrimination. According to them, UCI was singling out the MSU and engaging in "extremely troubling" silencing of dissent. Muslim activists argued that the punishment was selective, unprecedented and "smell[ed] of bias."

In September 2010, after the MSU appealed the suspension, UCI reduced the suspension to one quarter instead of one year, but the community service was increased from 50 to 100 hours and the probation period from one year to two.

Muslim students described experiencing a more hostile environment at UCI after the suspension. One MSU leader stated that members had endured personal attacks and had received hate mail. Another stated that people were afraid of associating with the MSU for fear of being targeted in the same way that the protestors were. Jennifer Medina in The New York Times commented that Israeli officials have had their speeches on U.S. campuses disrupted before, but that it didn't prompt disciplinary actions.

== Criminal charges ==
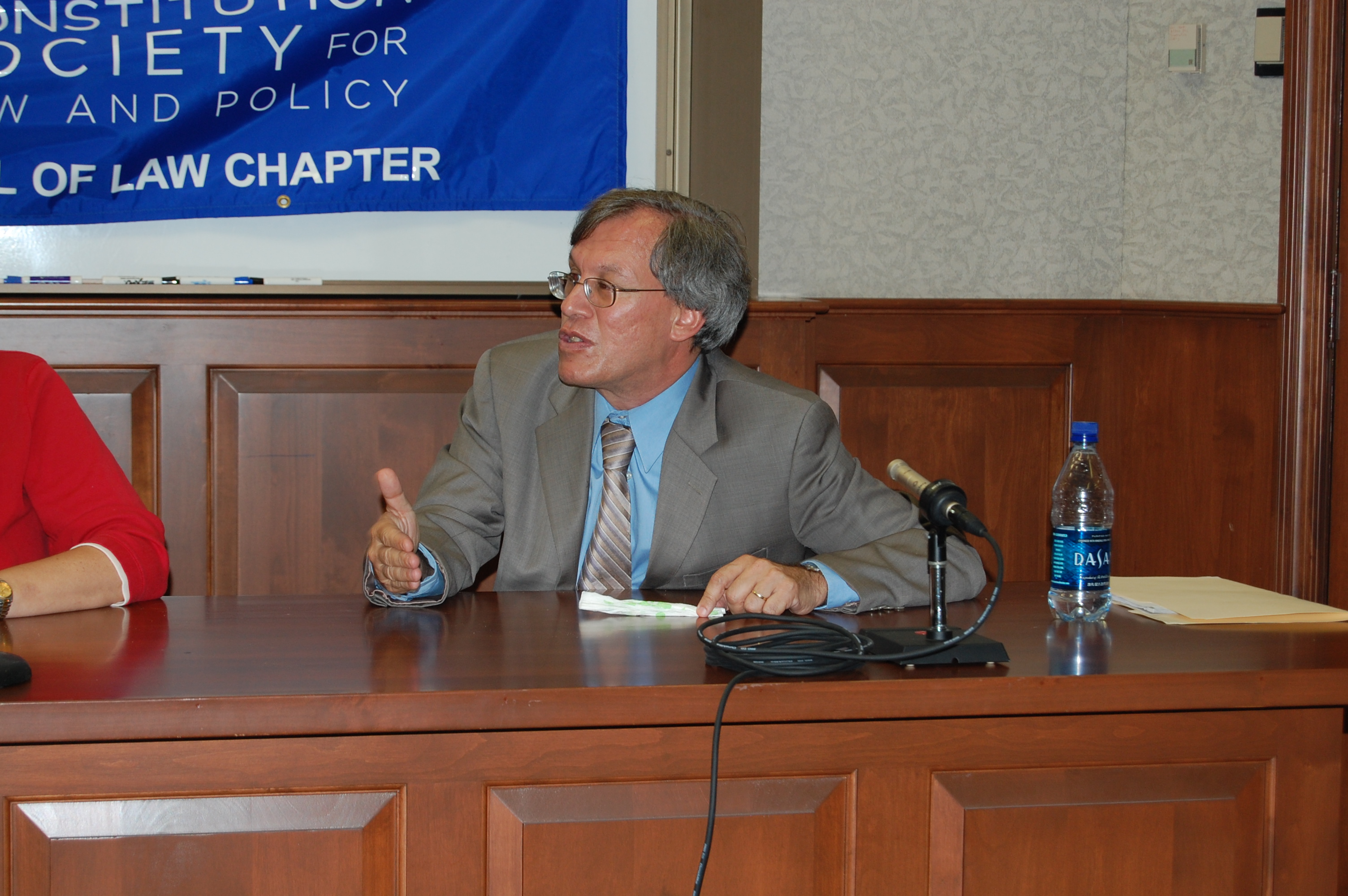
Erwin Chemerinsky supported disciplining the students but thought the criminal charges were unwarranted.

In February 2011, the Orange County District Attorney Tony Rackauckas filed criminal misdemeanor charges against the Irvine 11, accusing them of having disturbed a lawful meeting. Facing fierce criticism, Rackauckas defended the decision by claiming that the students had attempted to stop Oren's speech and that not prosecuting them would be "a failure to uphold the Constitution." A spokesperson for his office compared the students' protest with Ku Klux Klan attempting to silence a speech by Martin Luther King.

The right-wing Zionist Organization of America announced their satisfaction with Rackauckas' decision to file charges, stating that if he hadn't, he would have made a mockery of U.S. laws. The American Jewish Committee, the Jewish Council for Public Affairs, and the Jewish National Fund also supported the prosecution by filing an amicus brief on its behalf.

A large number of people and organizations, including the American Civil Liberties Union, and Chemerinsky, who had supported UCI's decision to punish the MSU, thought that the decision to file charges was wrongheaded. 50 people staged a protest outside Rackauckas' office.

Cecilie Surasky of the anti-Zionist Jewish Voice for Peace (JVP) called the prosecution "shocking" and argued that a double standard was at play because when activists from her group disrupted a speech by Benjamin Netanyahu in November 2010 they were hailed as heroes, whereas the Irvine 11 could face prison time. JVP organized a petition, collecting over 5,000 signatures, who stated that they also should be charged because they too had interrupted a speaker or an event to make a political point. Rachel Roberts, who had participated in the protest against Netanyahu, wrote in an editorial that the only difference between her group and Irvine 11 was that the former was Jewish and the latter Muslim. According to her, the prosecution demonstrated that Jews had more leeway than Muslims when speaking about the Middle East in American society.

The same month, 100 UCI faculty members, including five deans, wrote an open letter to Rackauckas, expressing their distress over his decision to file charges and urging him to drop them. They argued that the students were wrong to attempt to prevent a speaker from being heard and that the MSU acted inappropriately but that they had already been sufficiently punished. Criminal prosecution and sanctions, they argued, would be detrimental to their campus and also set a dangerous precedent for the use of criminal law against non-violent protests. Another open letter to Rackauckas, penned in March by 30 Jewish studies faculty members from seven UC campuses, also called for him to drop the charges. They wrote that they believed that the Irvine 11's peaceful protest should not confer criminal liability.

== The trial ==
The trial was held in September 2011. The defense argued that the students had exercised their freedom of speech, that Oren's speech had only briefly been delayed, and that they were targeted because they were Muslims. The longest interruption lasted eight seconds and the total time taken up by all eleven statements were only roughly one minute. The Center for Constitutional Rights in an amicus brief filed on behalf of the defendants cited numerous examples of "persistent, loud, and repeated" disruptions at UC speaking events that did not lead to prosecution. Among them, a protest in November 2001 in which the student group College Republicans shouted down a Muslim speaker, a lecture by Norman Finkelstein in February 2008 that was repeatedly interrupted by people shouting insults, and a 2009 panel with Max Blumenthal that was disrupted for over 20 minutes by protestors blocking the stage and yelling insults.

After two days of deliberation, the 12-person jury convicted ten of the students of one misdemeanor count of conspiring to disrupt Oren's speech and one for disrupting it. Each of them was sentenced to 56 hours of community service, three years of probation and fined. The eleventh student had previously accepted a plea bargain and had his charges dropped in exchange for 40 hours of community service.

Rackauckas, pleased with the verdict, referred to Irvine 11's protest as "organized thuggery" and cautioned against the "dire consequences" of not standing firm against such behavior. Dershowitz wrote that the protest was "censorial" and that the conviction was "a good day for the First Amendment".

Shakeel Syed, executive director of the Islamic Shura Council of Southern California, called the verdict "absolutely unbelievable" and said that it indicated that Muslims were treated as "permanent foreigners". Abdul Wahid, chairman of the UK-Executive Committee of Hizb ut-Tahrir in Britain, wrote that the verdict proved that the U.S. has a two-tier system of justice for Muslims and non-Muslims. Chemerinsky deemed the convictions harsh and said that Rackauckas had made a "terrible mistake" in prosecuting them. The Los Angeles Times called it "a case that never should have been" and the criminal charges disproportional. The Orange County Register wrote that the verdict "chills speech" and that the trial was an example of selective prosecution, finding it unlikely that the students would have been prosecuted if they had interrupted, say, a lecture on physics or biochemistry.

In March 2014, the convictions against the students were upheld by the appeal's court. Lawyers for the defendants indicated that they intended to appeal the decision.

== Views on the controversy ==
Legal scholar Faiza Majeed argues that the decision to prosecute Irvine 11 will alienate minority groups, chill free speech and student activism on campuses, and undermine the university ethos. According to him, the Irvine 11 case may have been an example of selective prosecution driven by prejudice against Muslims and by animosity towards the political views expressed by Irvine 11. Supporting this view, he argues, is the fact that the District Attorney's Office's internal emails referred to the case as the "UCI Muslim Case" and the fact that an anonymous source sent the District Attorney's Office a dossier containing emails between MSU leaders discussing their planned protest. Majeed also notes several similar incidents involving interruptions of public speakers that the District Attorney elected not to prosecute.

Asaad, one of the students involved in the protest, stated that he didn't regret his participation:

Without hesitation [this was] the single most important thing I've done during my college career and I don't regret it at all. That's part of who I want to be, that's part of how I want to be a doctor too. I want to be an activist and I want to be able to advocate for patients. I think it's strengthened my character, I think it's strengthened my skills as well.

UCI professor Jeffrey Kopstein asserted that the controversy confirmed the university's reputation as a flashpoint of anti-Israel activism.

== See also ==
- Chilling effect
- Heckler's veto
