= Michael Oren =

Israeli politician, diplomat, and historian

- מייקל אורן
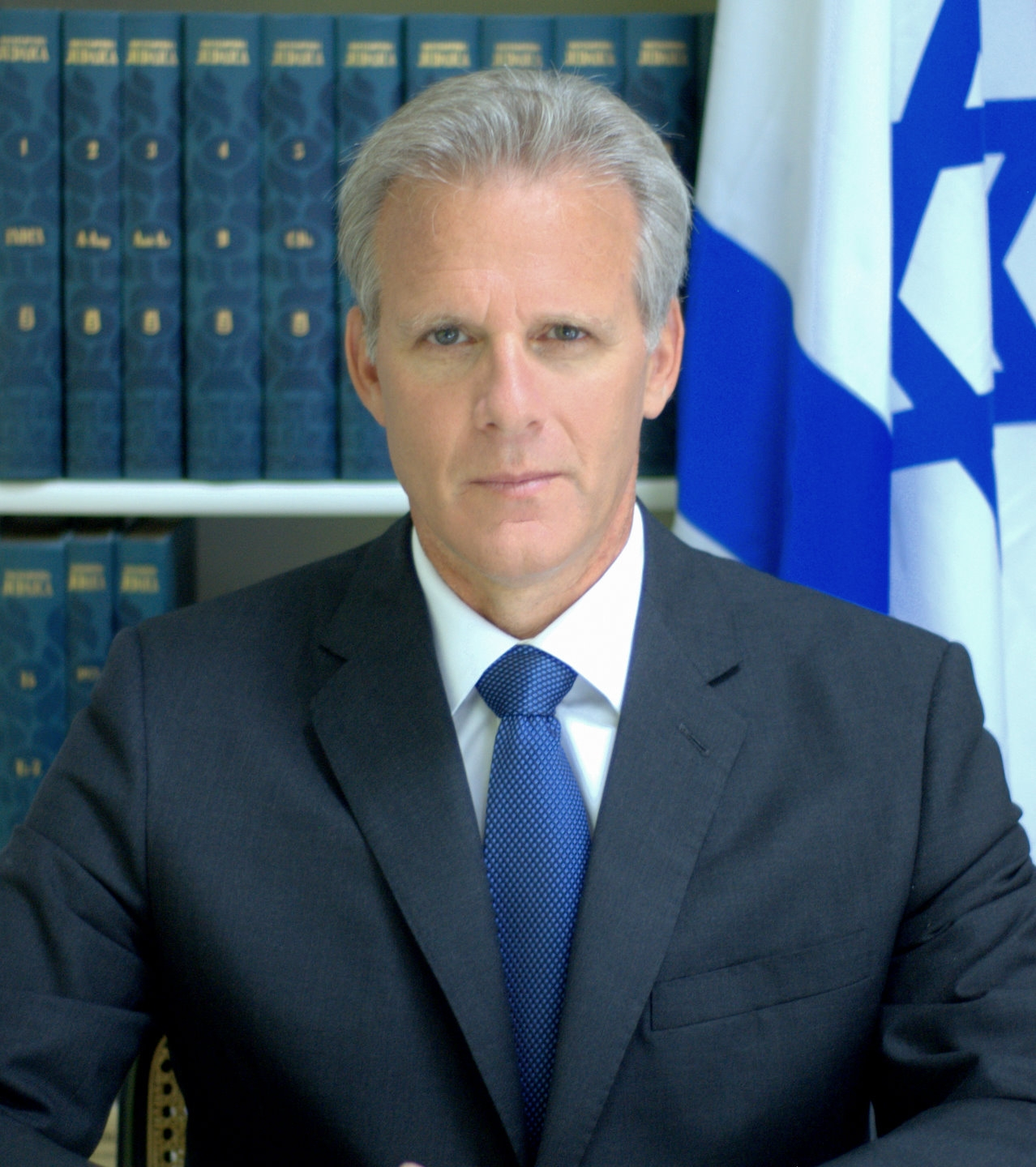
- Oren in August 2010

Israeli Ambassador to the United States
- In office July 20, 2009 – September 30, 2013
- Preceded by: Sallai Meridor
- Succeeded by: Ron Dermer

Faction represented in the Knesset
- 2015–2019: Kulanu

Personal details
- Born: Michael Scott Bornstein; May 20, 1955 (age 71) New York, U.S.
- Citizenship: Israeli (1979–present); American (1955–2009)
- Spouse: Sally Edelstein (m. 1982; div. 2016) Tamara G. Pechtold (m. 2024)
- Children: 3
- Education: Columbia University (BA, MA); Princeton University (PhD)
- Occupation: Essayist, novelist, politician, diplomat, historian
- Website: michaeloren.org

Military service
- Allegiance: State of Israel
- Branch/service: Israel Defense Forces

Michael Bornstein Oren (Hebrew: מייקל אורן; born Michael Scott Bornstein; May 20, 1955) is an American-Israeli diplomat, writer, and politician. He is a former Israeli ambassador to the United States (2009–2013), former member of the Knesset for the Kulanu party and a former Deputy Minister in the Prime Minister's Office.

Oren has written books, articles, and essays on Middle Eastern history and foreign affairs, and is the author of the New York Times best-selling Ally: My Journey Across the American-Israeli Divide, Power, Faith and Fantasy, and Six Days of War: June 1967 and the Making of the Modern Middle East, which won the Los Angeles Times History Book of the Year Award and the National Jewish Book Award. Oren has taught at Harvard, Yale, and Georgetown universities in the United States and at Ben-Gurion and Hebrew universities in Israel. He was a Distinguished Fellow at the Shalem Center in Jerusalem and a contributing editor to The New Republic. The Forward named Oren one of the five most influential American Jews, and The Jerusalem Post listed him as one of the world's ten most influential Jews.

Oren retired as ambassador to the United States in 2013, and was replaced by Ron Dermer. In the 2015 Israeli election, Oren was elected to the Knesset for the Kulanu party.

== Personal life and background ==
Oren was born Michael Scott Bornstein in upstate New York, the son of Marilyn (née Goldstein), a marriage and family therapist, and Lester Milton Bornstein, a hospital director. His father had served as an officer in the U.S. Army who took part in the D-Day invasion of Normandy and in the Battle of the Bulge in 1944 and participated in the Korean War. Oren grew up in West Orange, New Jersey, in a Conservative Jewish household. He attended West Orange Mountain High School. In his youth, he was an activist in Zionist and Jewish youth groups such as United Synagogue Youth. Reading about and working with then–Israeli ambassador to the United States, Yitzhak Rabin, strengthened Oren's decision to move to Israel and eventually become ambassador to the United States himself. Oren won two gold medals and one silver medal at the 1977 Maccabiah Games in rowing, a sport in which he remains active. At age 15, he made his first trip to Israel with the youth movement Habonim Dror, working on Kibbutz Gan Shmuel. In 1973, Oren won first prize in the PBS National Young Filmmaker's contest for the film, Comrades in Arms, which he wrote and directed.

In 1977 Oren completed his BA degree in International Relations from Columbia College. He continued his studies at Columbia, receiving an MA degree in International Affairs in 1978 from the School of International and Public Affairs, where he was an International Fellow and a DACOR Fellow. After college, he spent a year as an adviser to the Israeli delegation to the United Nations.

In 1979 Oren immigrated to Israel. Upon assuming Israeli citizenship, he changed his last name from "Bornstein" to "Oren", meaning "pine tree" in Hebrew. He renounced his American citizenship in 2009 upon his nomination as ambassador to the United States, since Israeli law prohibits international representatives from holding dual nationality.

A few years later, Oren returned to the United States to continue his education, receiving both his MA in 1984 and PhD in 1986 in Near Eastern Studies at Princeton University.

Oren was the Lady Davis Fellow of Hebrew University and a Moshe Dayan Fellow at Tel Aviv University.

In 1982 he married Sally Edelstein, who was born in San Francisco and immigrated to Israel in 1981. They have three children. In an article published in The Atlantic, Jeffrey Goldberg profiled Edelstein's acquaintance with rock stars Jimi Hendrix, Janis Joplin, and Jefferson Airplane. Marty Balin, one of the main songwriters of Jefferson Airplane, wrote two songs about her in the 1960s.

Oren's nephew is comedian Jon Rudnitsky.

Oren has three children, and six grandchildren. In December 2024, he married Tamara G. Pechtold. The two currently live in Jaffa.

== Military service ==
In 1979, Oren began his military service as a lone soldier in the Israel Defense Forces. He served as a paratrooper in the 1982 Lebanon War. His unit was caught in a Syrian ambush on the second day of the war. His commander was killed and nearly everyone was wounded. He then joined a unit stationed in Sidon. A day after his wedding, in the summer of 1982, Oren returned to Beirut.

Following his regular military service, Oren volunteered to work with the Zionist underground in the Soviet Union. Sent to make contact with Zionist groups in Ukraine, he was repeatedly arrested by the KGB.

During the Persian Gulf War he was Israeli liaison officer to the U.S. Sixth Fleet. He was called up for reserve duty for the 2005 Gaza disengagement, and participated in the evacuation of settlements. He served as an officer in the IDF Spokesman's Office during the 2006 Lebanon War. and the 2008–2009 Gaza War.

In February 2009, he delivered a lecture at Georgetown University on "The Gaza Operation: A Personal and Historical Perspective". The Today Show broadcast a special segment, "The Oren Family at War."

== Academic career ==
In the 1980s and early 1990s, Oren taught at Hebrew University of Jerusalem and Ben-Gurion University of the Negev. In 1995, during the government of Yitzhak Rabin, Oren served as an advisor in inter-religious affairs at the Ministry of Religious Affairs.

In 2006, Oren was a visiting professor at both Harvard University and Yale University, returning to Yale in 2007. Beginning in 2008, he became a visiting professor at Georgetown University's School of Foreign Service for the 2008–09 academic year as part of the faculty associated with the Program for Jewish Civilization.

President George W. Bush appointed Oren to serve on the honorary delegation to accompany him to Jerusalem for the celebration of the 60th anniversary of the State of Israel in May 2008.

While working at a think-tank in Jerusalem, Oren publicly opposed the 2003 Iraq war, believing at the time that America "should not get involved in state-building in a region where states are only held together by savage central power."

In 2004, a United States Department of State symposium was convened about the Six-Day War in response to the findings of the 2003 Moorer Commission and the 2004 release of Captain Ward Boston’s affidavit pertaining to the 1967 USS Liberty incident. Oren was amongst the speakers at the event, along with Marc J. Susser (the State Department’s official historian), A. Jay Cristol (who had just released his first book excusing the Liberty attack), and James Bamford (an author and Liberty advocate). During the symposium, Oren reiterated the official version of events and maintained that the attack was a case of mistaken identity. When several Liberty survivors, including former Petty Officer First Class Joseph C. Lentini and former Petty Officer Phillip F. Tourney, attempted to speak after the floor had been opened to questions, the State Department shut down the symposium.

Oren was named ambassador-in-residence at the Atlantic Council in 2014.

== Ambassadorship ==
On May 3, 2009, Oren was appointed as ambassador of Israel to the United States by Israeli Prime Minister Benjamin Netanyahu, succeeding Sallai Meridor. Ambassador Oren had to give up his United States citizenship in order to assume this post.

Oren strongly criticized the United Nations Fact Finding Mission on the Gaza Conflict report, which determined Israel was guilty of possible war crimes. In an October 2009 op-ed in The New Republic, he stated, "The Goldstone Report goes further than Ahmadinejad and the Holocaust deniers by stripping the Jews not only of the ability and the need but of the right to defend themselves."

In October 2009, Oren declined an invitation to attend a conference hosted by J Street, an Israel advocacy group, which has been critical of the Israel government's foreign policy, calling the organization "significantly out of the mainstream." However, according to Oren, later actions from the group put J Street "much more into the mainstream."

Oren has initiated Israel outreach events for Irish Americans, Latino and LGBT leadership, and the Chinese embassy. He hosted the Israeli embassy's first Iftar dinner.

On February 8, 2010, Oren spoke at the University of California, Irvine. During his speech Oren was interrupted by students who shouted, among other things, "Michael Oren, propagating murder is not an expression of free speech." The students, who became known as the Irvine 11, were first disciplined by the university and then had criminal charges brought against them. On September 23, 2011, a jury convicted them of disrupting Oren's speech. The charges and conviction were criticized by civil liberties advocates, as well as both Jewish and Muslim student groups.

Oren has lectured at numerous universities across the United States.

Following the Gaza flotilla raid in May 2010, Oren wrote an op-ed in The New York Times, "An Assault, Cloaked in Peace", in which he accused the organizers of the flotilla of attempting to "create a provocation" in order to "put international pressure on Israel to drop the Gaza embargo". He further made the claim that the Mavi Marmara was "a vessel too large to be neutralized by technical means".

While serving as ambassador to the U.S., Oren visited the United States Naval Academy in January 2012. Prior to his arrival, the midshipmen were ordered to not ask about or mention the controversial 1967 USS Liberty incident. According to several midshipmen, the pre-visit instructions were along the lines of, “It is not appropriate, in a setting like this, to bring up any major points of contention during conversation, current or historical. It is okay to talk about issues like Iran or the two-state solution, where our nations have a largely common view. But it’s not okay to bring up grievances like the USS Liberty, if you are familiar with that incident.” Oren spoke about the friendship between the U.S. Navy and the state of Israel: “His speech was primarily aimed at convincing a group of young midshipmen that Israel was their eternal and greatest ally. Drawing on historical anecdotes, he was able to create a sense of kinship between not just America and Israel, but the U.S. Navy and Israel.”

Oren attempted to influence a critical 2012 CBS report by Bob Simon about Palestinian Christians in Israel, with some calling his interference an attempt to silence the American media. Oren responded that at no point had he tried to prevent the 60 Minutes report, rather that he offered suggestions for balancing the segment.

On July 5, 2013, he announced that he would be leaving his post as ambassador to the United States in fall 2013. According to the Israeli daily Haaretz, insiders say that Oren wanted to keep his job, but was removed because Prime Minister Benjamin Netanyahu's senior advisor Ron Dermer wanted the envoy post.

Oren has received four honorary doctorates and has delivered commencement speeches at Brandeis University, Monmouth University, and Yeshiva University. In 2011, he received the Outstanding Achievers with Learning Disabilities Award from the Lab School of Washington, D.C. He delivered the keynote address at 2012 Equality Forum on LGBT rights in Israel. He was awarded the Scholar-Statesman Award from the Washington Institute for Near East Policy and the Dr. Martin Luther King Jr. legacy prize for international service. In 2025, Oren was appointed as a Gildenhorn Fellow by the Wilson Center for leadership in diplomacy, public service, and global affairs.

== Writings ==
=== Political commentary ===
Oren has written many articles commenting on current political issues. Before assuming his diplomatic post, he published frequently in The New York Times, The Wall Street Journal, the Los Angeles Times, Politico, and The New Republic, where he was a contributing editor. He appeared on Charlie Rose, The Daily Show, and the Today Show. As ambassador, he has published nearly sixty op-eds and has given dozens of television interviews, including Bill Maher, Colbert Report, The View, and The Situation Room with Wolf Blitzer. He served as the Middle East analyst for CNN and CBS.

His two full-length articles "Israel: The Ultimate Ally" and "Israel's Resilient Democracy", were published in Foreign Policy magazine.

In July 2014 Oren argued against a ceasefire and for the continuation of the 2014 Israel–Gaza conflict, calling on the international community to leave Israel alone to defang and deprive Hamas of its heavy arms and make it pay a "prohibitive cost."

On June 15, 2015, Oren gave a speech at the Leonardo Hotel in Jerusalem, in which he said that the Boycott, Divestment and Sanctions (BDS) movement poses a "strategic threat" to Israel, which needs to fight it "like a war, which it is". He also warned that the U.S. is gambling with Israel's future over Iran, saying that the U.S. "can afford to make a mistake" with them, while "Israel has zero room for error", adding: "The United States has the most powerful army in all of history, they're thousands of miles away from Iran, and they don't feel any direct threat. Israel is in Iran's backyard, and faces a clear and direct threat from Iranian proxies such as Hezbollah and Hamas. The IDF is a strong military force, but does not have the capacity and magnitude the US Army has to deter aggression."

Also during June 2015, an op-ed piece by Oren published in The Wall Street Journal claimed that Barack Obama had deliberately sabotaged US-Israeli relations, resulting in Kulanu leader Moshe Kahlon distancing himself and the party from Oren's stated views. Shortly afterwards another article by Oren was published by Foreign Policy, which argued that Obama's outreach to the Muslim world was partly rooted in "abandonment" by his father and stepfather. Oren was criticised by Abe Foxman of the Anti-Defamation League, who said that Oren's theorising resembled "conspiracy theories" and "amateur psychoanalysis", and characterised it as "borderline stereotyping". Foxman's successor at the ADL, Jonathan Greenblatt, later publicly apologized for the remark.

External videos
- Presentation by Oren on Ally, June 26, 2015, C-SPAN

In 2015, Oren published Ally: My Journey Across the American-Israeli Divide (June 2015), a New York Times bestseller which aimed to describe the recent state of Israel–US relations. The book has received both praise and criticism, including a negative review by Philip H. Gordon titled "Bibi's man in D.C., still spinning for the boss" and a positive review by Bret Stephens for The Wall Street Journal which called the book "the smartest and juiciest diplomatic memoir that I've read in years." In response to its controversial reception, Oren stated: "So far a lot of things have been said about me. ... I obviously touched a nerve." Noah Efron wrote in Haaretz that the book continued the self-professed "armchair psychoanalyzing" of the U.S. president and chided Oren for failing to assign any responsibility to Israeli for the decline in US-Israel relations.

=== Middle East history ===
External videos
- Presentation by Oren on Six Days of War, June 17, 2002, C-SPAN
- Booknotes interview with Oren on Six Days of War, August 25, 2002, C-SPAN
- Interview with Oren on Six Days of War, April 7, 2003, C-SPAN
- Presentation by Oren on Six Days of War, June 21, 2003, C-SPAN
- Presentation by Oren on Power, Faith, and Fantasy, January 15, 2007, C-SPAN
- Presentation by Oren on Power, Faith, and Fantasy, September 29, 2007, C-SPAN

Power, Faith and Fantasy, a history of American involvement in the Middle East, was published by Norton in 2007 and quickly became a New York Times bestseller. Power, Faith and Fantasy earned positive reviews from Newsweek, The Washington Post, The New York Times Book Review, the San Francisco Chronicle, and the Willamette Week.

Oren's Six Days of War (2002) is a historical account of the events of the Six-Day War between Israel and its Arab neighbors. The book was widely praised by critics and won the Los Angeles Times Book Prize for History and the National Jewish Book Award. It spent seven weeks on the New York Times bestseller list. The New York Times Book Review wrote positively of Six Days of War, as did The Washington Post, which called it "not only the best book so far written on the Six Day War, it is likely to remain the best". Oren's Ph.D. thesis, "The Origins of the Second Arab-Israel War: Israel, Egypt, and the Great Powers, 1952-1956," was published in 1992.

=== Fiction ===
Oren has written works of fiction for which he has been called a “disturbingly good writer” by Hadassah Magazine and “a master of the short story” by The Jerusalem Post.

Sand Devil, published in 2000, is a trilogy of novellas set in the Negev desert. Reunion, based on his father's stories from World War II, appeared in 2004.

The Night Archer and Other Stories, published in 2020, is a collection of fifty-one short stories. His novel, To All Who Call in Truth, was published in May 2021. His latest novel, Swann’s War, was described by Kirkus Reviews as “intriguing, wonderfully delineated, and tension-filled,” and awarded a star rating.

== Knesset career ==
Oren was given the fourth spot on the list of the new Kulanu party before Israel's 2015 elections, adding foreign policy credentials to a party that campaigned almost exclusively on economic issues. He was elected and, on March 31, sworn in as a Member of Israel's 20th Knesset, serving on its Foreign Affairs and Defense Committee. On August 1, 2016, it was announced that Oren would be appointed as deputy minister in the Prime Minister's office in charge of public diplomacy. Oren decided to forgo running in the elections for Israel's 21st Knesset.

== Legislation ==
Oren supported the creation of a new Israeli national holiday, Yom HaAliyah (Hebrew: יום העלייה, Aliyah Day) to be celebrated annually on the tenth of the Hebrew month of Nisan (Hebrew: י’ ניסן). On 21 June 2016 the Knesset voted in favor of adding Yom HaAliyah to the national calendar. The Yom HaAliyah bill was co-sponsored by Knesset members from different parties in a rare instance of cooperation across the political spectrum. The day chosen for Yom HaAliyah is, according to the biblical narrative, the day Joshua and the Israelites crossed the Jordan River at Gilgal into the Promised Land. It was thus the first documented "mass Aliyah".

== Published work ==
- Sand Devil. Toby Press (2000) ISBN 1592642128.
- Six Days of War: June 1967 and the Making of the Modern Middle East. Presidio Press (2002) ISBN 978-0-345-46192-6.
- Reunion. New York: Plume. (2003) ISBN 978-1-931561-26-6.
- Power, Faith and Fantasy: The United States in the Middle East, 1776 to 2006. New York: W.W. Norton & Co. (2007) ISBN 978-0-393-33030-4.
- New Essays on Zionism. Shalem Press. (2007) ISBN 978-965-7052-44-0 (editor, with David Hazony and Yoram Hazony).
- The Origins of the Second Arab-Israeli War. Routledge (2013) ISBN 1138977799.
- Ally: My Journey Across the American-Israeli Divide. Random House (2015) ISBN 978-081-2996-41-8.
- The Night Archer and Other Stories. Wicked Son (2020)
- To All Who Call in Truth. Wicked Son (2021)
- Swann's War. Dzanc Press (2022)
- Israel 2048: The Rejuvenated State. Toby Press (English, Hebrew and Arabic) (2023)
