= Un Coup de Dés Jamais N'Abolira Le Hasard =

Un Coup de Dés Jamais N'Abolira Le Hasard may refer to:

- Un Coup de Dés Jamais N'Abolira Le Hasard (Mallarmé), a poem by Stéphane Mallarmé published in 1897/1914;
- Un Coup de Dés Jamais N'Abolira Le Hasard (Broodthaers), an art book by Marcel Broodthaers, based on the former work, published in 1969.
