= Nova Cinema =

Nova Cinema may refer to:

- Nova Cinema (Brussels), also known as Cinéma Nova
- Nova Cinema (Czech Republic)
- Nova Cinema (Greece)

== See also ==
- Cinema Nova, Melbourne, Australia
- Palace Cinemas (Australia), a cinema chain with several cinemas named (or formerly named) Nova or Palace Nova
