= Stéphane Mallarmé =

French Symbolist poet (1842–1898)

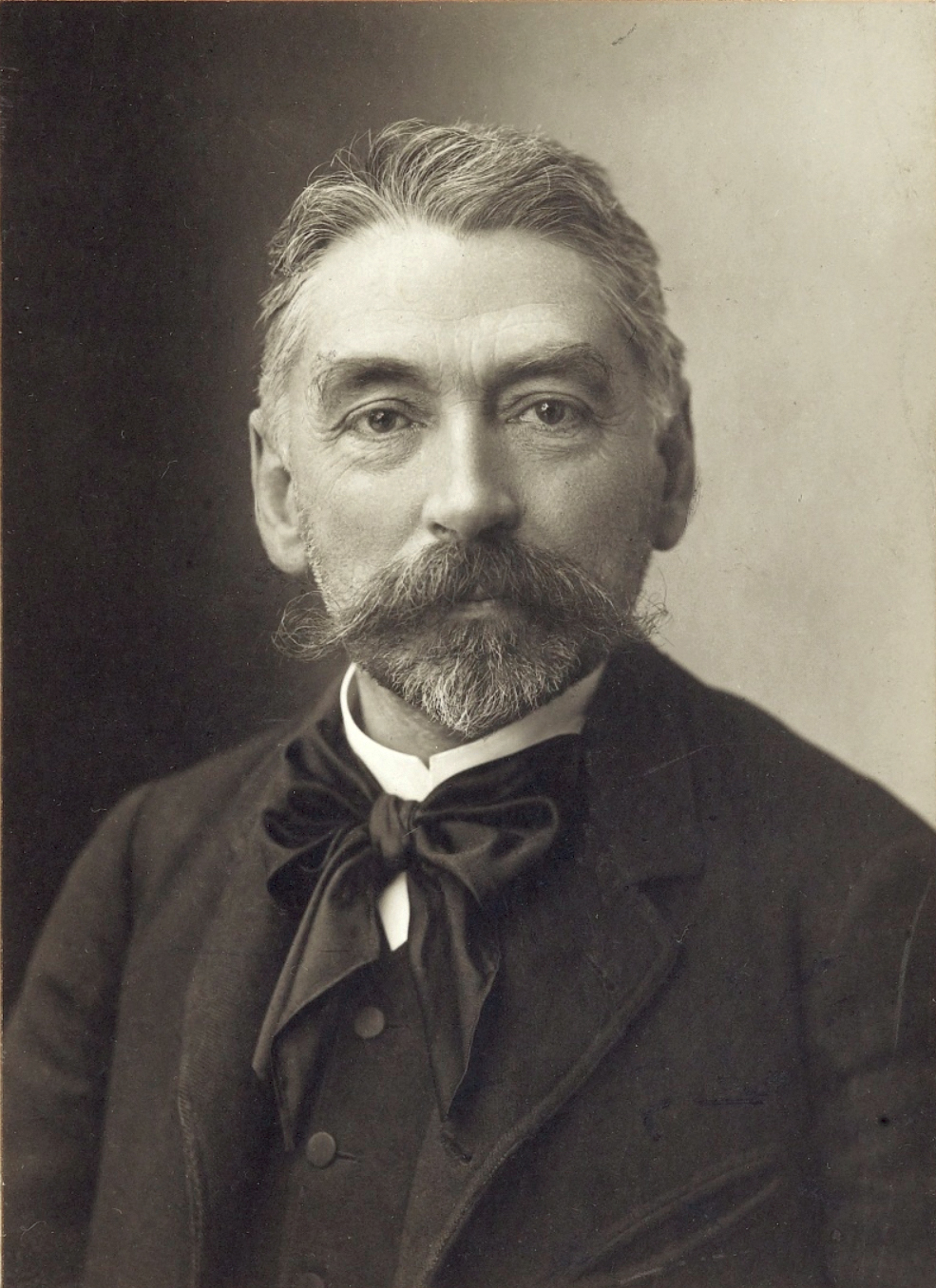
- Portrait by Nadar, 1890
- Born: Étienne Mallarmé; 18 March 1842; Paris, France
- Died: 9 September 1898 (aged 56); Vulaines-sur-Seine, France
- Occupation: Poet
- Spouse: Maria Christina Gerhard (m. 1863)
- Children: 2
- Writing career
- Movement: Symbolism

Étienne Mallarmé (UK: /ˈmælɑːrmeɪ/ MAL-ar-may, US: /ˌmælɑːrˈmeɪ/ mal-ar-MAY; 18 March 1842 – 9 September 1898), known professionally as Stéphane Mallarmé (French: [stefan malaʁme]), was a French poet and critic. He was a major French Symbolist poet, and his work anticipated and inspired several revolutionary artistic schools of the early 20th century, such as Cubism, Futurism, Dadaism, and Surrealism.

== Biography ==
Mallarmé was born in Paris on 18 March 1842. He was a boarder at the Pensionnat des Frères des écoles chrétiennes à Passy between 6 or 9 October 1852 and March 1855. He worked as an English teacher and spent much of his life in relative poverty but was famed for his salons, occasional gatherings of intellectuals at his house on the rue de Rome for discussions of poetry, art and philosophy. The group became known as les Mardistes, because they met on Tuesdays (in French, mardi), and through it Mallarmé exerted considerable influence on the work of a generation of writers. For many years, those sessions, where Mallarmé held court as judge, jester and king, were considered the heart of Paris intellectual life. Regular visitors included W. B. Yeats, Rainer Maria Rilke, Paul Valéry, Stefan George, Paul Verlaine and many others. Along with other members of La Revue Blanche such as Jules Renard, Julien Benda and Ioannis Psycharis, Mallarmé was a Dreyfusard.

On 10 August 1863, he married Maria Christina Gerhard. They had two children, Geneviève in 1864 and Anatole in 1871. Anatole died in 1879. Mallarmé died in Valvins (present-day Vulaines-sur-Seine), near Fontainebleau, on 9 September, 1898.

== Style ==
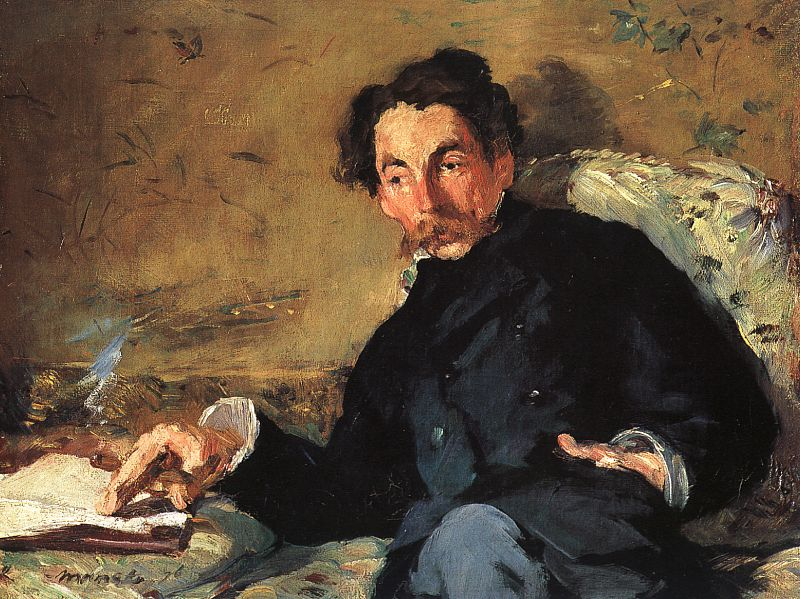
Édouard Manet, Portrait of Stéphane Mallarmé, 1876

Mallarmé's earlier work owes a great deal to the style of Charles Baudelaire who was recognised as the forerunner of literary Symbolism. Mallarmé's later fin de siècle style, on the other hand, anticipates many of the fusions between poetry and the other arts that were to blossom in the next century. Most of this later work explored the relationship between content and form, between the text and the arrangement of words and spaces on the page. This is particularly evident in his last major poem, Un coup de dés jamais n'abolira le hasard ('A roll of the dice will never abolish chance') of 1897.

Some consider Mallarmé one of the French poets most difficult to translate into English. The difficulty is due in part to the complex, multilayered nature of much of his work, but also to the important role that the sound of the words, rather than their meaning, plays in his poetry. When recited in French, his poems allow alternative meanings which are not evident on reading the work on the page. For example, Mallarmé's Sonnet en '-yx' opens with the phrase ses purs ongles ('her pure nails'), whose first syllables when spoken aloud sound very similar to the words c'est pur son ('it's pure sound'). Indeed, the 'pure sound' aspect of his poetry has been the subject of musical analysis and has inspired musical compositions. These phonetic ambiguities are very difficult to reproduce in a translation which must be faithful to the meaning of the words.

== Influence ==
=== General poetry ===
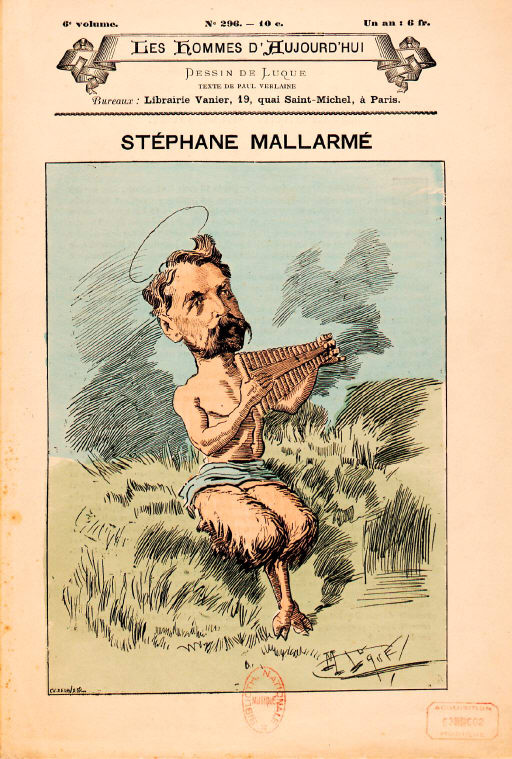
Stéphane Mallarmé as a faun, cover of the literary magazine Les hommes d'aujourd'hui, 1887.

Mallarmé's poetry has been the inspiration for several musical pieces, notably Claude Debussy's Prélude à l'après-midi d'un faune (1894), a free interpretation of Mallarmé's poem L'après-midi d'un faune (1876), which creates powerful impressions by the use of striking but isolated phrases. Maurice Ravel set Mallarmé's poetry to music in Trois poèmes de Mallarmé (1913). Other composers to use his poetry in song include Darius Milhaud (Chansons bas de Stéphane Mallarmé, 1917) and Pierre Boulez (Pli selon pli, 1957–62).

Man Ray's last film, entitled Les Mystères du Château de Dé (The Mystery of the Chateau of Dice) (1929), was greatly influenced by Mallarmé's work, prominently featuring the line "A roll of the dice will never abolish chance".

Mallarmé is referred to extensively in the latter section of Joris-Karl Huysmans' À rebours, where Des Esseintes describes his fervour-infused enthusiasm for the poet: "These were Mallarmé's masterpieces and also ranked among the masterpieces of prose poetry, for they combined a style so magnificently that in itself it was as soothing as a melancholy incantation, an intoxicating melody, with irresistibly suggestive thoughts, the soul-throbs of a sensitive artist whose quivering nerves vibrate with an intensity that fills you with a painful ecstasy." [p. 198, Robert Baldick translation]

The critic and translator Barbara Johnson has emphasized Mallarmé's influence on twentieth-century French criticism and theory: "It was largely by learning the lesson of Mallarmé that critics like Roland Barthes came to speak of 'the death of the author' in the making of literature. Rather than seeing the text as the emanation of an individual author's intentions, structuralists and deconstructionists followed the paths and patterns of the linguistic signifier, paying new attention to syntax, spacing, intertextuality, sound, semantics, etymology, and even individual letters. The theoretical styles of Jacques Derrida, Julia Kristeva, Maurice Blanchot, and especially Jacques Lacan also owe a great deal to Mallarmé's 'critical poem.'"

=== Un coup de dés ===
It has been suggested that "much of Mallarmé's work influenced the conception of hypertext, with his purposeful use of blank space and careful placement of words on the page, allowing multiple non-linear readings of the text. This becomes very apparent in his work Un coup de dés."

In 1990, Greenhouse Review Press published D. J. Waldie's American translation of Un coup de dés in a letterpress edition of 60 copies, its typography and format based on examination of the final (or near final) corrected proofs of the poem in the collection of Harvard's Houghton Library.

Prior to 2004, Un coup de dés was never published in the typography and format conceived by Mallarmé. In 2004, 90 copies on vellum of a new edition were published by Michel Pierson et Ptyx. This edition reconstructs the typography originally designed by Mallarmé for the projected Vollard edition in 1897 and which was abandoned after the sudden death of the author in 1898. All the pages are printed in the format (38 cm by 28 cm) and in the typography chosen by the author. The reconstruction has been made from the proofs which are kept in the Bibliothèque Nationale de France, taking into account the written corrections and wishes of Mallarmé and correcting certain errors on the part of the printers Firmin-Didot.

A copy of this edition is in the Bibliothèque François-Mitterrand. Copies have been acquired by the Bibliothèque littéraire Jacques-Doucet and University of California, Irvine, as well as by private collectors. A copy has been placed in the Museum Stéphane Mallarmé at Vulaines-sur-Seine, Valvins, where Mallarmé lived and died and where he made his final corrections on the proofs prior to the projected printing of the poem.

In 2012, the French philosopher Quentin Meillassoux published The Number and the Siren, a rigorous attempt at 'deciphering' the poem on the basis of a unique interpretation of the phrase 'the unique Number, which cannot be another.'

In 2015, Wave Books published A Roll of the Dice Will Never Abolish Chance, a dual-language edition of the poem, translated by Robert Bononno and Jeff Clark (designer). Another dual-language edition, translated by Henry Weinfield, was published by University of California Press in 1994.

The poet and visual artist Marcel Broodthaers created a purely graphical version of Un coup de dés, using Mallarmé's typographical layout but with the words replaced by black bars. In 2018, Apple Pie Editions published un coup de des jamais n'abolira le hasard: translations by Eric Zboya, an English edition that transforms the poem not only through erasure, but through graphic imaging software.

== Selected works ==
- Afternoon of a Faun
- Poésies
- Divagations
- A Throw of the Dice will Never Abolish Chance

== References and sources ==
Sources

- Hendrik Lücke: Mallarmé - Debussy. Eine vergleichende Studie zur Kunstanschauung am Beispiel von „L'Après-midi d'un Faune“. (= Studien zur Musikwissenschaft, Bd. 4). Dr. Kovac, Hamburg 2005, ISBN 3-8300-1685-9.
