= Geoffrey G. O'Brien =

American poet

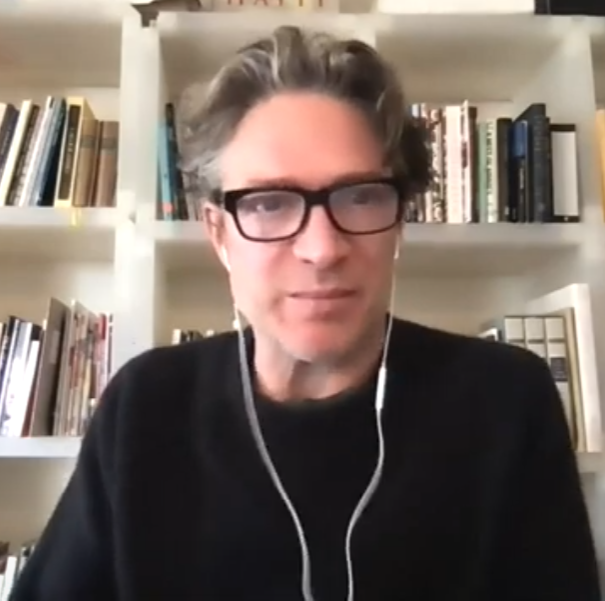
- Hosting UC Berkeley's Lunch Poems in 2022
- Born: Geoffrey Gordon O'Brien; May 10, 1969 (age 57); United States
- Occupations: Poet, lecturer
- Writing career
- Language: English
- Genre: Poetry

Geoffrey Gordon O'Brien (born May 10, 1969) is an American poet. Educated at Harvard University and the University of Iowa, O'Brien has taught at Brooklyn College, The University of Iowa Writers' Workshop and has been the Distinguished Poet in Residence at St. Mary's College of California and the Holloway Lecturer in the Practice of Poetry at the University of California, Berkeley, where he currently teaches. He also teaches in the Prison University Project at San Quentin.

On November 9, 2011, O'Brien suffered a rib injury in an altercation with police while attending Occupy Cal.

O'Brien's poem "Fidelio" was published in the March 19, 2018 issue of The New Yorker magazine.

== Works online ==
- "from Metropole" The Offending Adam, Issue 22
- "Logic of Confession" at No: a journal of the arts.
- "Poem Beginning to End," Boston Review, September/October 2009
- "Mixed Mode," Poets.org

=== Criticism ===
- An essay on "Tradition and the Individual Talent" by T. S. Eliot.
- "Keeping Company," an essay which explores the work of poet Michael Palmer
- A Critical Response to John Ashbery's "Clepsydra"
- "The Left Margin" a talk on Whitman and Ashbery

== Works ==
- The Guns and Flags Project (University of California Press, 2002)
- 2A (Quemadura, 2006; collaboration with poet Jeff Clark)
- Green and Gray (University of California Press, 2007)
- Hesiod (The Song Cave (chapbook), 2010)
- Poem with No Good Lines (Hand Held Editions (chapbook), 2010)
- Metropole (University of California Press, 2011)
- People on Sunday (Wave Books, 2013)
- Three Poets: Ashbery, Donnelly, O'Brien (Minus A Press, 2013)
- Experience in Groups (Wave Books, 2018)

== Review ==
O'Brien touches on the most pressing questions and dilemmas of being human in this time and place with welcome playfulness, for example, situating "tower" and "Guadalajara" as an off-rhyme, explicitly noting the juxtaposition within "the rhyme of laws and loss," and doubling up negatives, as in "not here but not/ Not." In so doing, O'Brien produces many bizarre and beautiful linguistic combinations that shed light on peculiarly American anxieties of the 21st century

If O'Brien's poems have a sameness of diction and rhythm that verges on monotonous and impersonal, it's the same sameness of heartbeat and breath, prayer and meditation. It's a poetry that asks for patient attention, and gives back all the void's abundance.

== Political protest ==
On November 9, 2011, O'Brien took part in Occupy Cal, a demonstration on the Berkeley campus in solidarity with the Occupy Wall Street movement. According to reports O'Brien spoke out to a police officer who was hitting a Berkeley student because he would not break his link in a human chain. The police officer hit O'Brien in the ribs, a reaction he would later call "brutal."
