= Quentin Meillassoux =

French philosopher (born 1967)

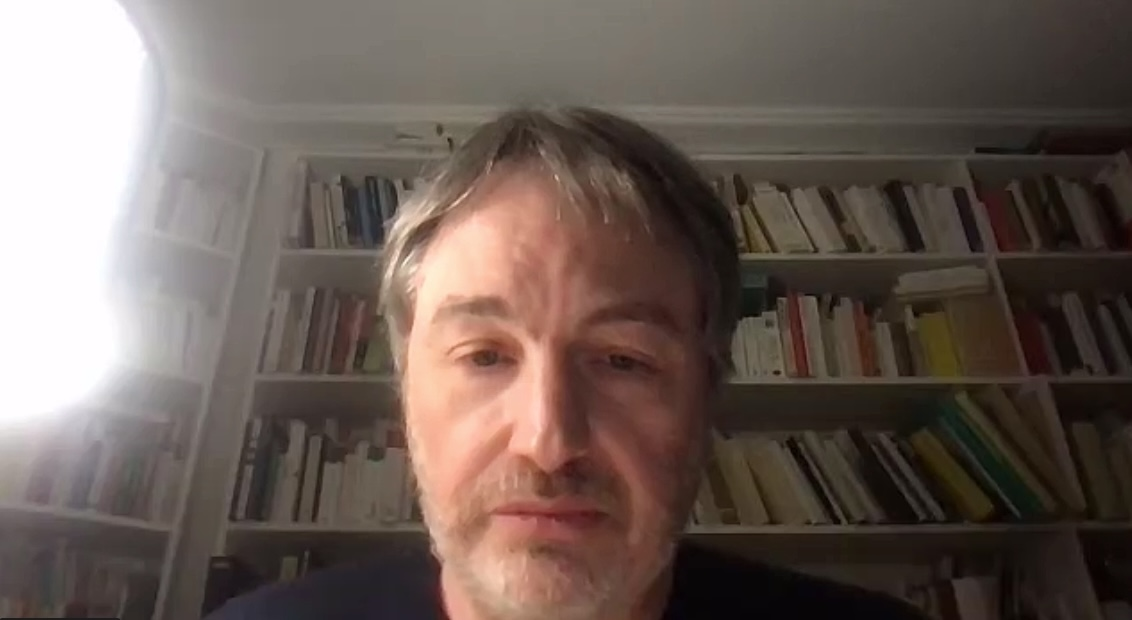
- Born: 26 October 1967 (age 58); Paris, France

Education
- Education: École Normale Supérieure; Lille III (PhD, 1997)
- Thesis: L'inexistence Divine (1997)
- Doctoral advisor: Bernard Bourgeois

Philosophical work
- Era: Contemporary philosophy
- Region: Western philosophy
- School: Continental philosophy Speculative realism (speculative materialism)
- Institutions: École Normale Supérieure; Paris I
- Main interests: Metaphysics, philosophy of mathematics
- Notable ideas: Speculative materialism, correlationism, facticity, factiality, ancestrality

Quentin Meillassoux (/meɪ.əˈsuː/; French: [mɛjasu]; born 26 October 1967) is a French philosopher. He teaches at the Université Paris 1 Panthéon-Sorbonne.

== Biography ==
Quentin Meillassoux is the son of the anthropologist Claude Meillassoux. He is a former student of the philosophers Bernard Bourgeois and Alain Badiou. He is married to the novelist and philosopher Gwenaëlle Aubry.

== Philosophical work ==
Meillassoux's first book is After Finitude (Après la finitude, 2006). Alain Badiou, Meillassoux's former teacher, wrote the foreword. Badiou describes the work as introducing a new possibility for philosophy which is different from Immanuel Kant's three alternatives of criticism, skepticism, and dogmatism. The book was translated into English by Ray Brassier. Meillassoux is associated with the speculative realism movement.

In this book, Meillassoux argues that post-Kantian philosophy is dominated by what he calls "correlationism", the theory that humans cannot exist without the world nor the world without humans. In Meillassoux's view, this theory allows philosophy to avoid the problem of how to describe the world as it really is independent of human knowledge. He terms this reality independent of human knowledge as the "ancestral" realm. Following the commitment to mathematics of his mentor Alain Badiou, Meillassoux claims that mathematics describes the primary qualities of things as opposed to their secondary qualities shown by perception.

Meillassoux argues that in place of the agnostic scepticism about the reality of cause and effect, there should be a radical certainty that there is no causality at all. Following the rejection of causality, Meillassoux says that it is absolutely necessary that the laws of nature be contingent. The world is a kind of hyper-chaos in which the principle of sufficient reason is not necessary although Meillassoux says that the principle of non-contradiction is necessary.

For these reasons, Meillassoux rejects Kant's Copernican Revolution in philosophy. Since Kant makes the world dependent on the conditions by which humans observe it, Meillassoux accuses Kant of a "Ptolemaic Counter-Revolution." Meillassoux clarified and revised some of the views published in After Finitude during his lectures at the Free University of Berlin in 2012.

Several of Meillassoux's articles have appeared in English via the British philosophical journal Collapse, helping to spark interest in his work in the Anglophone world.

His unpublished dissertation L'inexistence divine (1997) is noted in After Finitude to be "forthcoming" in book form; as of 2021, it had not yet been published. In Parrhesia, in 2016, an excerpt from Meillassoux's dissertation was translated by Nathan Brown, who noted in his introduction that "what is striking about the document... is the marked difference of its rhetorical strategies, its order of reasons, and its philosophical style" from After Finitude, counter to the general view that the latter merely constituted "a partial précis" of L'inexistence divine; he notes further that the dissertation presents a "very different articulation of the Principle of Factiality" from that in After Finitude. While Nathan Brown's translation uses the French text of the 1997 dissertation, in 2011 Graham Harman used a 2003 revision to offer a partial translation of Meillassoux's ongoing work of expanding the dissertation into a book.

In September 2011, Meillassoux's book on Stéphane Mallarmé was published in France under the title Le nombre et la sirène. Un déchiffrage du coup de dés de Mallarmé. In this second book, he offers a detailed reading of Mallarmé's famous poem "Un coup de dés jamais n'abolira le hasard" ("A Throw of the Dice Will Never Abolish Chance"), in which he finds a numerical code at work in the text.

== Bibliography ==
=== Books ===
- After Finitude: An Essay on the Necessity of Contingency, trans. Ray Brassier (Continuum, 2008). ISBN 978-2-02109-215-8
- The Number and the Siren: A Decipherment of Mallarme's Coup De Des (Urbanomic, 2012). ISBN 978-0-98321-692-6
- Time Without Becoming, edited by Anna Longo (Mimesis International, 2014). ISBN 978-8-85752-386-6
- Science Fiction and Extro-Science Fiction, trans. Alyosha Edlebi (Univocal, 2015). ISBN 978-1-937561-48-2

=== Articles ===
- "Potentiality and Virtuality," in Collapse: Philosophical Research and Investigations, Volume II (Speculative Realism), ed. Robin Mackay (Urbanomic, 2007): 55–81.
- "Subtraction and Contraction: Deleuze, Immanence and Matter and Memory," in Collapse: Philosophical Research and Investigations, Volume III (Unknown Deleuze [+Speculative Realism]), ed. Robin Mackay (Urbanomic, 2007): 63–107.
- "Presentation by Quentin Meillassoux," in Collapse: Philosophical Research and Investigations, Volume III (Unknown Deleuze [+Speculative Realism]), ed. Robin Mackay (Urbanomic, 2007): 408–449.
- "Spectral Dilemma," in Collapse: Philosophical Research and Investigations, Volume IV (Concept Horror), ed. Robin Mackay (Urbanomic, 2008): 261–275.
- "The Immanence of the World Beyond," in Grandeur of Reason: Religion, Tradition and Universalism, ed. Peter M. Chandler Jr. and Connor Cunningham, trans. Peter M. Chandler Jr., Adrian Pabst, and Aaron Riches (SCM Press, 2010): 444–478.
- (with Florian Hecker and Robin Mackay) "Speculative Solution: Quentin Meillassoux and Florian Hecker Talk Hyperchaos," on Urbanomic, published 2010.
- (with Florian Hecker, Robin Mackay, and Elie Ayache) "Metaphysics and Extro-Science Fiction," in Speculative Solution, ed. and trans. Robin Mackay (Urbanomic, 2010).
- "Metaphysics, Speculation, Correlation," trans. Taylor Adkins, Pli: The Warwick Journal of Philosophy Vol. 22 (2011): 3–25.
- "History and Event in Alain Badiou," trans. Thomas Nail, Parrhesia Vol. 12 (2011): 1–11.
- "The Contingency of the Laws of Nature," trans. Robin Mackay, Environment and Planning D: Society and Space Vol. 30, No. 2 (2012): 322–334.
- "Badiou and Mallarmé: The Event and the Perhaps," trans. Alyosha Edlebi, Parrhesia Vol. 16 (2013): 35–47.
- "The Materialist Divinization of the Hypothesis," in Collapse: Philosophical Research and Investigations, Volume VIII (Casino Real), ed. Robin Mackay (Urbanomic, 2014): 813–846.
- "Decision and Undecidability of the Event in Being and Event I and II," trans. Alyosha Edlebi, Parrhesia Vol. 19 (2014): 22–35.
- "Excerpts from L'inexistence divine," in Graham Harman, Quentin Meillassoux: Philosophy in the Making (2nd Edition), trans, Graham Harman (Edinburgh University Press, 2015): 224–287.
- "Iteration, Reiteration, Repetition: A Speculative Analysis of the Sign Devoid of Meaning," in Genealogies of Speculation: Materialism and Subjectivity Since Structuralism, ed. Armen Avanessian and Suhail Malik, trans, Robin Mackay and Moritz Gansen (Bloomsbury, 2016): 117–197.
- "From L'inexistence divine," trans. Nathan Brown, Parrhesia Vol. 25 (2016): 20–40.

=== Interviews ===
- (with Rick Dolphijn and Iris van der Tuin) "Interview with Quentin Meillassoux," in New Materialism: Interviews & Cartographies, ed. Rick Dolphijn and Iris van der Tuin, trans. Marie-Pier Boucher (Open Humanities Press, 2012): 71–81.
- (with Sinziana Ravini) "'Archeology of the Future': Interview with Quentin Meillassoux," Palatten Vol. 1/2 (2013): 86–97.
- (with Graham Harman) "Interview with Quentin Meillassoux (August 2010)," Graham Harman, Quentin Meillassoux: Philosophy in the Making (2nd Edition), trans, Graham Harman (Edinburgh University Press, 2015): 208–223.
- (with Kağan Kahveci and Sercan Çalci) "Founded on Nothing: An Interview with Quentin Meillassoux," trans. Robin Mackay on Urbanomic, published 2021.

== See also ==
- New materialism
