= Christine Hume =

American poet and essayist

- Born: 1968 (age 57–58); Alaska, U.S.
- Education: Penn State University; Columbia University School of the Arts; University of Denver
- Occupations: Poet essayist
- Writing career
- Genre: Poetry

Christine Hume (born 1968) is an American poet and essayist. She is the author of three books of poetry, Musca Domestica (2000), Alaskaphrenia (2004), and Shot (2010) and two works of nonfiction, Saturation Project and Everything I Never Wanted to Know. Her chapbooks include Lullaby: Speculations on the First Active Sense (Ugly Duckling Press, 2008), Ventifacts (Omnidawn Press, 2012), Hum (Dikembe Press, 2014), Atalanta: an Anatomy (Essay Press, 2016), Question Like a Face (Image Text Ithaca, 2017), a collaboration with Jeff Clark and Red: A Different Shade for Each Person Reading the Story (PANK Books, 2020). She is faculty in the Creative Writing Program at Eastern Michigan University.

== Life ==
Hume received her BA, MFA, and PhD degrees from Penn State University, Columbia University School of the Arts, and University of Denver, respectively. She has taught at Stuyvesant High School, Illinois Wesleyan University, The School of the Art Institute in Chicago, and is currently a Professor of English at Eastern Michigan University, where she has worked since 2001. Hume has written and lectured on sound poetry, audio documentary poetics, voice, and radio from a feminist perspective. From 2006 to 2010 she hosted an internet radio program, Poetry Radio, featuring contemporary and historic performance arts, sound poetry, audio narratives, sound art, and collaborations between writers and musicians. She has collaborated on sonic arrangements for her work with Stephen Vitiello, Gregory Whitehead, Ben Miller, and other musicians. In the last decade, Hume's creative interests have shifted to creative nonfiction.

In 2002, she was one of two Americans invited to an international festival, “Days of Poetry and Wine” in Slovenia; in 2006, she taught a poetry workshop in St. Petersburg for Summer Literary Seminars, and in 2012 she taught a writing workshop on the walk in Lisbon for Disquiet: Dzanc Books International Literary Program.

== Awards ==
- Barnard Women Poets Prize, 1999
- Green Rose Award
- 2005 Best Book of the Year Award, Small Press Traffic
- Fine Arts Work Center Fellow, 1998–99
- Wurlitzer Foundation, 2000
- Fund For Poetry, 2002
- MacDowell Colony residency, 2003

== Works ==
Musca Domestica, Hume's first book of poetry and winner of the Barnard New Women Poets Prize, was published in 2000 by Beacon Press. Her second book, Alaskaphrenia, winner of the Green Rose Award and Small Press Traffic's Best Book of 2004 Award, was published in 2004 by New Issues. Her book Shot was published in 2010 by Counterpath Press. Question Like a Face (ITI Press, 2017), a text-image collaboration with her partner, Jeff Clark, was one of The Brooklyn Rail's Best Nonfiction Books of 2017. In his review of her work in the New York Times, Ken Kalfus wrote, "Saturation Project is sometimes elusive, but there’s no meaning in it that gets lost for long. When Hume’s thematic connections and redemptive insights arrive, it’s with the force of a hurricane."

Her prose and criticism have appeared in Harper's, Architecture and Culture, Conjunctions, Denver Quarterly, Contemporary Literature, Disability Studies Quarterly, Rain Taxi, Chicago Review, How2, Afgabe, Constant Critic, Women's Studies Quarterly as well as three volumes of a series by Wesleyan University Press, Poets in the 21st Century. In 2019, she edited and introduced a #MeToo-focused issue of American Book Review.

=== Books ===
- Everything I Never Wanted to Know. Ohio State University Press, 2023.
- The Saturation Project. Solid Objects, 2021.
- A Different Shade for Each Person Reading the Story. Pank Books, 2020.
- Question Like a Face. ITI Press, 2017.
- Ventifacts. Omnidawn, 2012.
- Shot. Counterpath Press, 2010.
- Lullaby: Speculations on the First Active Sense. Ugly Duckling Presse, 2008.
- Alaskaphrenia. New Issues Press, 2004.
- Musca Domestica. Beacon Press, 2000.

=== Anthologies ===
- Christina Mengert; Joshua Marie Wilkinson, eds. 12x12. University of Iowa Press, 2008.
- Catherine Wagner; Rebecca Wolff, eds. Not for Mothers Only: Contemporary Poems on Child-Getting and Child-Rearing. Fence Books, 2007.
- Michael Dumanis, Cate Marvin, eds. Legitimate Dangers: American Poets of the New Century. Sarabande, 2006.
- Brian Henry; Andrew Zawacki, eds. The Verse Book of Interviews: 27 Poets on Language, Craft & Culture. Wave Books, 2005.
- Brett Fletcher Lauer, Aimee Kelley, eds. Isn't It Romantic: 100 Love Poems by Younger American Poets. Wave Books, 2004.
- Reginald Shepherd, ed. The Iowa Anthology of New American Poetries. University of Iowa Press, 2004.
- Gerald Costanzo; Jim Daniels, eds. American Poetry: the Next Generation. Carnegie Mellon University Press, 2000.
- James Tate; David Lehman, eds. Best American Poetry 1997. Simon and Schuster, 1997.
