= Jeff Clark (designer) =

American poet and book designer

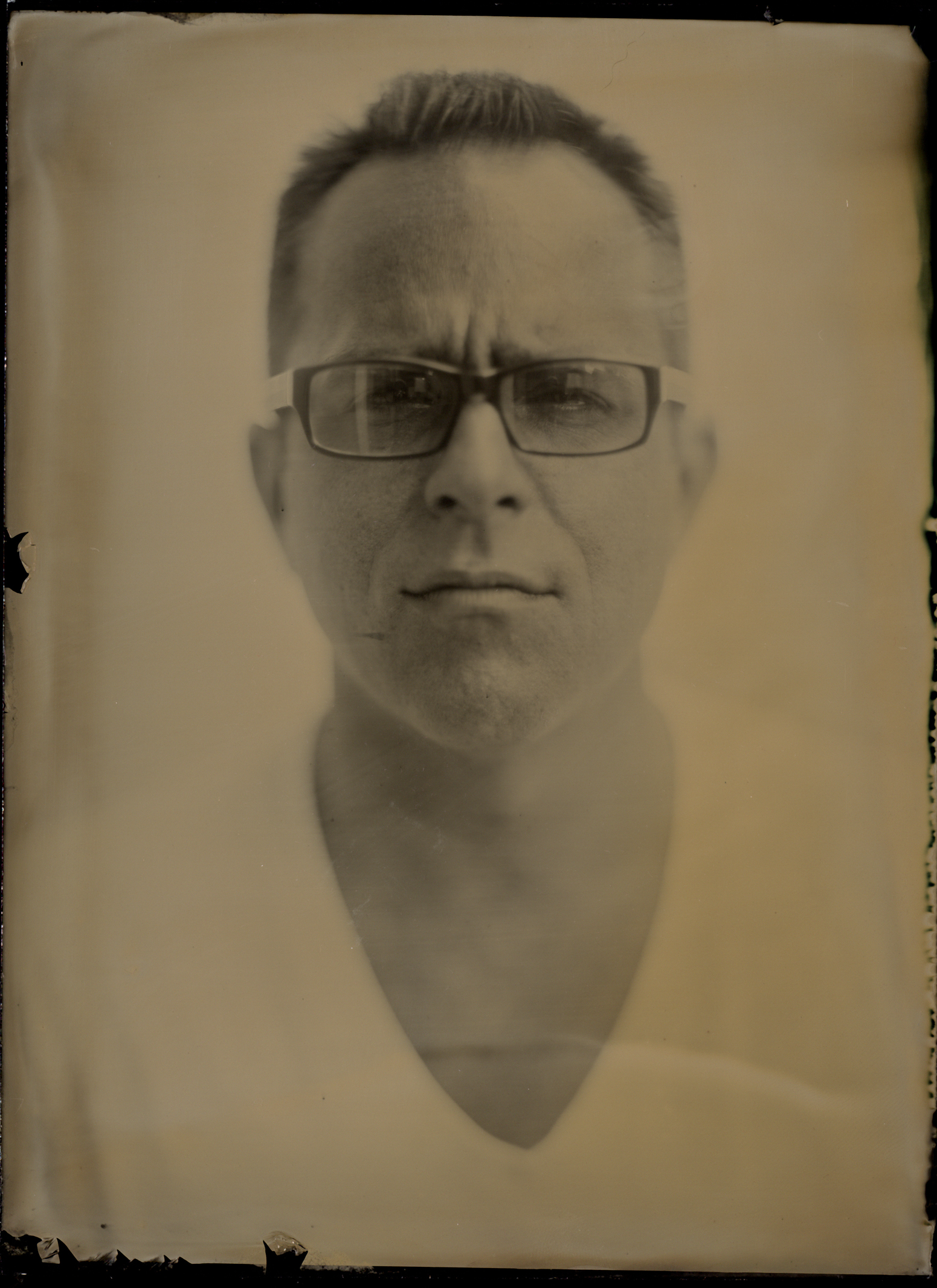
Jeff Clark, from an ambrotype by Filipe da Veiga Ventura Alves and Rute de Carvalho Magalhães, 2012

Jeff Clark (born 1971) is an American poet and book designer.

== Biography ==
Clark grew up in southern California. He studied at UC Davis and completed a Master of Fine Arts in poetry at the Iowa Writer's Workshop. At Davis, Clark drummed for the band Buick, whose album Sweatertongue was released by Lather Records in 1992.

In 1995, he moved to San Francisco, where he wrote poetry, edited the zine Faucheuse, and worked at a book design studio.

== Writing ==
Clark's first book, The Little Door Slides Back, was a 1996 winner of the National Poetry Series award. It was published by Sun and Moon Press in 1997, and reprinted in 2004 by Farrar, Straus and Giroux. John Yau, writing in Boston Review, said that Clark evoked "a fragile, interior world largely lit by the moon, cheap paperbacks, and noir movies, a place in which predicaments and paradoxes abound." Farrar Straus Giroux also published Clark's second collection, Music and Suicide, which received the 2004 James Laughlin Award. John Beer in Chicago Review said "its ambition is more erotic than programmatic, which makes it hard to place in a critical landscape dominated by twin towers of linguistic materialism and idle taste-mongering. But if this erotic ambition is one more aspect of Clark's untimeliness, that untimeliness may allow him to escape mere datedness to disclose a new poetic future for us all."

In 2000, German artist Cosima von Bonin created an installation entitled The Little Door Slides Back for the Kunstverein Braunschweig. Also in 2000, Z Press published Sun On 6, which was printed by Leslie Miller at The Grenfell Press. In addition to Clark's poem, it contains Jasper Johns' first linocut.

In June 2006, Clark and Geoffrey G. O'Brien released a collaborative book entitled 2A, and in 2009, Turtle Point Press published Ruins, a limited edition book that Clark wrote, illustrated, and designed. With Robert Bononno, Clark translated Stéphane Mallarmé's Un Coup de Dés Jamais N'Abolira Le Hasard (Wave Books, 2015). In 2017, Image Text Ithaca released Question Like a Face. a limited-edition collaborative work, with text by Christine Hume and image treatments by Clark.

== Book Design ==
Clark's book design studio, Crisis, is based in Ypsilanti, Michigan. He has designed books for, among others, AK Press, University of Minnesota Press, Flood Editions, Leon Works, Kelsey Street Press, the Jargon Society, Dalkey Archive Press, Wave Books, Farrar Straus Giroux, Black Square Editions, City Lights Books, and MOCAD (Museum of Contemporary Art Detroit). He also designs the covers for Two Lines, the literary journal from the Center for the Art of Translation.

In January 2008, Publishers Weekly wrote: "Clark has become one of poetry's most prolific and influential book designers, whose distinctive treatments—characterized by spacious covers; hip, angular fonts; varied elements that elide into one another—a frequent poetry reader could recognize from a distance."
