= Un coup de dés jamais n'abolira le hasard (Mallarmé) =

1897 poem written by Stéphane Mallarmé

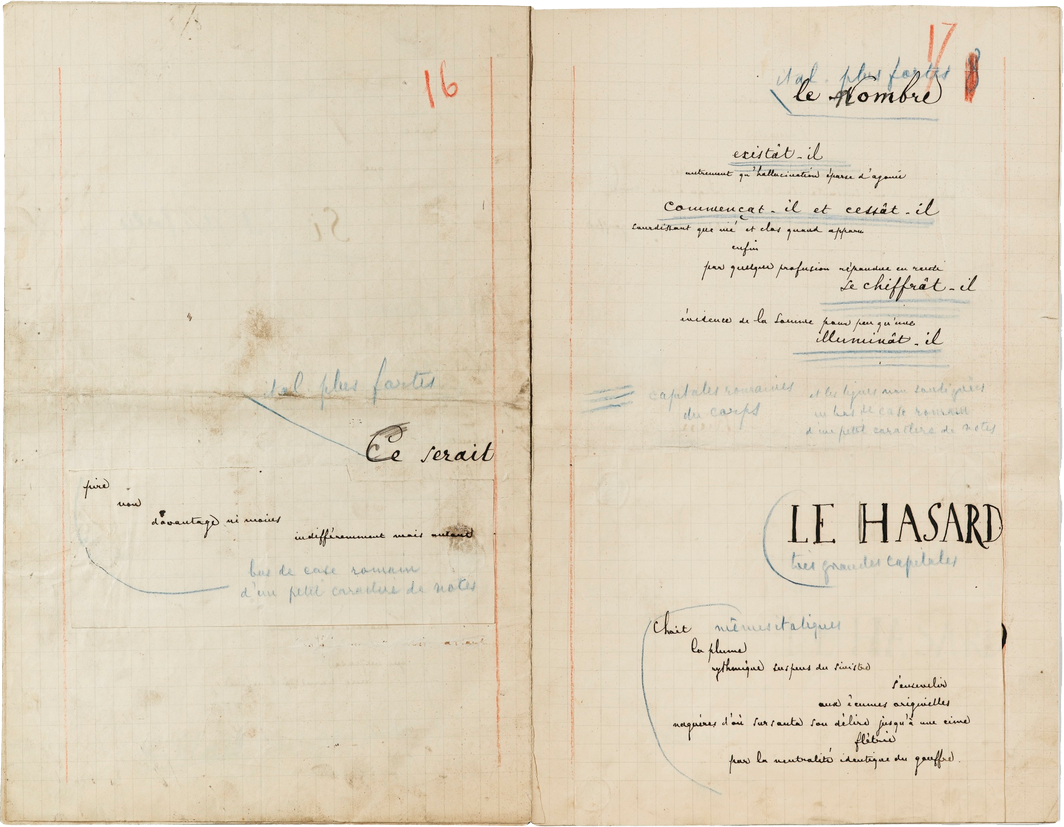
Autograph layout (1896).

"Un coup de dés jamais n'abolira le hasard" ("A Throw of the Dice will Never Abolish Chance") is a poem by the French Symbolist poet Stéphane Mallarmé. Its intimate combination of free verse and unusual typographic layout anticipated the 20th-century interest in graphic design and concrete poetry.

== History ==
The poem was written by Mallarmé in 1897 and published in May of that same year in the magazine Cosmopolis, but was published in book form only in 1914, 16 years after the author's death, based on his extensive notes and exacting instructions. The first edition was printed on July 10, 1914 by the Imprimerie Sainte Catherine at Bruges, in a private 60-copy issue.

== The poem ==
The poem is spread over 20 pages, in various typefaces, amidst liberal amounts of blank space. Each pair of consecutive facing pages is to be read as a single panel; the text flows back and forth across the two pages, along irregular lines.

The sentence that names the poem is split into three parts, printed in large capital letters on panels 1, 6, and 8. A second textual thread in smaller capitals apparently begins on the right side of panel 1, QUAND BIEN MÊME LANCÉ DANS DES CIRCONSTANCES ÉTERNELLES DU FOND D'UN NAUFRAGE ("Even when thrown under eternal circumstances from the bottom of a shipwreck"). Other interlocking threads in various typefaces start throughout the book. At the bottom right of the last panel is the sentence Toute Pensée émet un Coup de Dés ("Every Thought issues a Throw of Dice").

== Critical interpretation ==
The philosopher Quentin Meillassoux argues that the formal construction of the poem is governed by the book's physical relationship to the number 12, while the contents of the poem are constructed under a metrical constraint related to the number 7. Meillassoux claims that the "Number" referenced in the poem explicitly refers to 707, which is, by his count, the number of words in the 1898 version of the text.

== Translations into English ==
- "A Dice Throw", Mallarmé: The Poems (Penguin, 1977), translated by Keith Bosley
- "A Throw of the Dice", Early Writings by Frank O'Hara (Grey Fox Press, 1977)
- "Dice Thrown Never Will Annul Chance", Selected Poetry and Prose, edited by Mary Ann Caws (New Directions, 1982), translated by Brian Coffey
- "A Throw of the Dice", Collected Poems (University of California Press, 1994), translated by Henry Weinfeld
- "A Dice Throw At Any Time Never Will Abolish Chance", Collected Poems and Other Verse (Oxford University Press, 2006), translated by E. H. and A. M. Blackmore
- A Roll of the Dice Will Never Abolish Chance (Wave Books, 2015), translated by Robert Bononno and Jeff Clark

== See also ==
- Un Coup de Dés Jamais N'Abolira Le Hasard (Broodthaers), a purely graphical recreation of the poem by Marcel Broodthaers.
- 1914 in poetry
- 1897 in poetry
- List of most expensive books and manuscripts
