= Gwenaëlle Aubry =

French writer

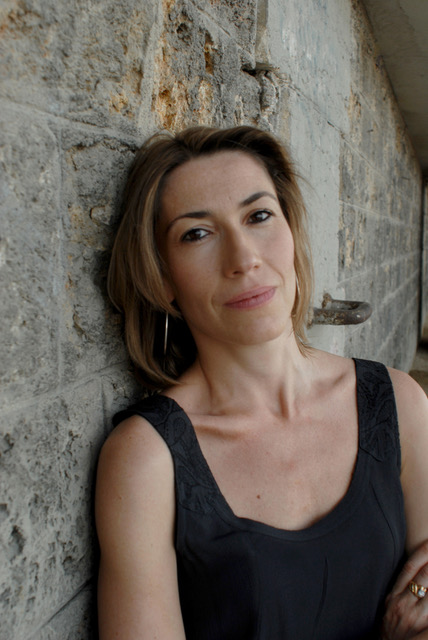
- Gwenaëlle Aubry (2018)
- Born: 2 April 1971 (age 55)
- Education: Ecole Normale Supérieure; Trinity College, Cambridge; Université de Paris IV-Sorbonne
- Occupations: French novelist and philosopher
- Writing career
- Language: French
- Notable works: Le Diable détacheur, Actes Sud, bourse Cino del Duca 1999; L'Isolée, Stock, 2002; L'Isolement, Stock, 2003; Notre vie s'use en transfigurations, Actes Sud, 2007; Personne, Mercure de France, 2009; Partages, Mercure de France, 2012; Lazare mon amour, L'Iconoclaste, 2016; Perséphone 2014, Mercure de France, 2016; La Folie Elisa, Mercure de France, 2018; Saint Phalle. Monter en enfance, Stock, 2021; Zone base vie, Gallimard, 2024; La lettre absente, Editions du Nie-de-Pie, 2024
- Notable awards: Prix Femina for Personne

Gwenaëlle Aubry (born 2 April 1971) is a French novelist and philosopher.

== Personal life and education ==
After two years of preparatory classes at the Lycée Henri-IV in Paris, Aubry began her studies at the École Normale Supérieure in 1989 at the age of eighteen, earning an agrégation in Philosophy in 1992. She then received the Knox Scholarship at Trinity College, Cambridge, where she earned a Master of Philosophy. In 1998, she received a Doctorate in Philosophy from the Université de Paris IV-Sorbonne.

She is married to the philosopher Quentin Meillassoux.

== Career ==
She was a Maîtresse de conférences in ancient and general philosophy at the Université de Nancy II from 1999 to 2002. Since then she has worked at the Centre national de la recherche scientifique [National Centre for Scientific Research] where she now serves as a Directrice de recherche. She is also a member of the Board of Directors at the Théâtre national de la Colline.

== Her work ==
She published her first novel, Le Diable détacheur, in 1999 with Actes Sud. It was reissued in 2012 by Mercure de France.

2002 saw the publication of L'Isolée, which was inspired by Florence Rey, and then revised and expanded in 2003 with the addition of the short narrative L'Isolement.

In 2007, after a residence at the Villa Medici, she published Notre vie s'use en transfigurations, excerpts of which were staged by Sarah Oppenheim for the play "Donnez-moi donc un corps!", put on in 2017 by the Théâtre du Soleil.

In 2009, Aubry received the Prix Femina for Personne, an alphabet-novel, which is a portrait of a melancholic "from twenty-six angles with nothing at the center". The book was also short-listed for the Prix Médicis, the Grand Prix du Roman de l'Académie française, the Prix Novembre, and the Prix de Flore. It has been translated into a dozen languages and was published in the United States as No One in Trista Selous's translation with a preface by Rick Moody. In 2022, it inspired the title of Annette Messager's exhibition "Comme si" at the Lille Métropole Museum of Modern, Contemporary, and Outsider Art (LaM). In January 2024, it was staged at Théâtre 14 by Sarah Karbasnikoff and Elisabeth Chailloux, with a revival planned at the Théâtre de la Ville for April 2026.

In 2012 Partages was published, a "book of hauntings", which mirrors, sometimes on alternating pages, the voices of two young girls, one Jewish, the other Palestinian, in Israel during the Second Intifada. It was long-listed for the Prix Goncourt and was a finalist for the Grand Prix du Roman de l'Académie française.

In 2015, she published "Lazare mon amour", a prismatic portrait of Sylvia Plath, in L'Une et L'Autre. She then adapted it into a play, which was published separately in 2016.

In 2016 the autobiographical novel Perséphone 2014 was published. Performed by the author and accompanied by the guitarist Sébastien Martel, the text was also staged by Anne Monfort on the occasion of the tenth Festival de Caves. Pauline Cheviller staged it as "Perséphone ou le combat de vivre" at the Théatre Le Liberté in Toulon in September 2019. Partial translations into English have appeared from Benjamin Eldon Stevens (Arion, winter 2018, 25.3: 161–173), Wendeline A. Hardenberg (Asymptote, April 2019), and Richard Jonathan.

In 2018 her novel La Folie Elisa was published. A staged version featuring Aubry, guitarist Sébastien Martel, and Judith Chemla was performed in November 2018. In 2019, another stage production by Baptiste Guiton was performed at the Festival d'Avignon as part of the Voix d'auteurs series (France Culture-SACD), with Aubry's participation alongside Judith Chemla, Marianne Denicourt, Marie-Sophie Ferdane, and Céline Sallette. It was then turned into a radio broadcast by France Culture. Partial translations by Wendeline A. Hardenberg have appeared in Columbia Journal (October 2021) and Asymptote (April 2024).

A meditative examination of the life and work of the artist Niki de Saint Phalle, entitled Saint Phalle: Monter en enfance, came out with Stock in 2021. It was a finalist in the essay or non-fiction category for the Prix Médicis, the Prix Renaudot, the Prix de la Contre-Allée, the Grand Prix SGDL, and the Prix Pierre Daix.

Zone base vie, a novel set during the Covid-19 pandemic lock-down in Paris, was published by Gallimard in 2024.

Also in 2024, Aubry collected together a number of essays about the craft of her writing into a book called La lettre absente, published by Editions du Nie-de-Pie.

Aubry produced a radio play adaptation of Hermann Broch's The Death of Virgil for France Culture and has written literary studies of Yves Bonnefoy, W. G. Sebald, and Georges Perec, as well as short works published in magazines and journals, particularly La Nouvelle Revue française. She is also the author of several books and a number of articles on ancient philosophy and its contemporary reception, as well as a translator from ancient Greek(Plotinus, Porphyrus, Proclus).

Aubry's philosophical research focuses on two main areas of inquiry, oriented around the question of the subject and the question of power. Growing out of her initial work on Plato's hêmeis ("we"), she has sought to "develop an alternative concept of the subject as plural, virtual, without identity, and to trace the buried lineage that carries its legacy up to Deleuze." She is also the author of an Archéologie de la puissance in two volumes: Dieu sans la puissance. Dunamis et energeia chez Aristote et Plotin (Vrin, 2007; new revised and expanded edition, 2020) and Genèse du Dieu souverain (Vrin, 2019). Overall, the project consists of demonstrating that the ontology of power and action are not constructed based on Aristotle, but against him. The first volume identifies in Aristotle's Metaphysics an alternative ontology, which enables thinking about being and god without power. The second volume proposes a critical genesis of the Christian theology of omnipotence and derives the political effects of the concept of omnipotence as arbitrary and sovereign power.

== Major works ==
- Le Diable détacheur, Actes Sud, 1999 (reissued by Mercure de France, 2012, winner of the Bourse Cino Del Duca)
- L'Isolée, Stock, 2002
- L'Isolement, Stock, 2003 (L'isolée/L'isolement, reissued by Mercure de France, 2010)
- Plotin. Traité 53 (I, 1) Introduction, translation, commentary and notes, Cerf, Collection Les Ecrits de Plotin, 2004
- Notre vie s'use en transfigurations, Actes Sud, 2007
- Dieu sans la puissance: Dunamis et Energeia chez Aristote et chez Plotin (essai), Vrin, 2007
- Le moi et l'intériorité, Vrin, 2008 (editor)
- Personne, Mercure de France, 2009 (winner of the Prix Femina)
- Partages, Mercure de France, 2012
- Lazare mon amour, L'Iconoclaste, 2016
- Perséphone 2014, Mercure de France 2016
- Genèse du Dieu souverain. Archéologie de la puissance II, Vrin, 2019
- La Folie Elisa, Mercure de France, 2018
- Saint Phalle. Monter en enfance, Stock, 2021
- Zone base vie, Gallimard, 2024
- La lettre absente, Editions du Nie-de-Pie, 2024
