= Claude Meillassoux =

French neo-Marxist economic anthropologist and Africanist

Claude Meillassoux (/ˌmeɪəˈsuː/; French: [mɛjasu]; December 26, 1925 – January 2, 2005) was a French neo-Marxist economic anthropologist and Africanist. A student of Georges Balandier, he did fieldwork among the Guro (Gouro) of Côte d'Ivoire; his thesis was published in 1964. In the 1970s he criticised Marshall Sahlins's use of the notion of "domestic mode of production". Meillassoux was throughout his life a politically committed critic of social injustice.

== Early life and education ==
Meillassoux was born at Roubaix, in northern France, to a family of textile manufacturers. After studying law and political science at the Institut d'études politiques at Paris, he went in 1948 to study at the University of Michigan's School of Business.

== Career ==
Meillassoux returned to France run the family textile business but, tiring of administration, spent some time in the United States, employed by the commissariat à la productivité as an interpreter for visiting French industrialists. On his return to France, he served as intermediary between American experts and French businesses. Joining the Centre d'action des gauches indépendantes (CAGI), he met Georges Balandier, and worked for him in producing an inventory of works by British functionalists on black Africa. Having taken classes taught by Balandier at the École pratique des hautes études in humanities and social sciences, Meillassoux went in 1956 to the Ivory Coast as an economic expert on a research project involving the Guro. In 1962, having defended his thesis under the supervision of Balandier, he took a position at the École pratique des hautes études.

He joined the French National Centre for Scientific Research as a researcher under Pierre Monbeig in 1964, working on a project under the direction of Jean Rouch (whom he went on to succeed). In 1979, Meillassoux was appointed co-director of a research team on Rural Societies and Development Policies, later becoming research director. In 1982 he took a position heading a project focused on Southern Africa, and in 1986 founded a research group on Southern Africa involving researchers, academics, doctoral students, anthropologists, sociologists and economists. In the 2000s he worked on a critical anthropological study of the Bible, with a focus on kinship ties.

In 1984, he was awarded the French National Centre for Scientific Research silver medal for his work.

Meillassoux died in 2005 in Paris. His son Quentin is an academic philosopher.

== Books ==
- Femmes, greniers et capitaux (1975, Maspero; transl. as Maidens, Meal and Money: Capitalism and the Domestic Community)
- Anthropologie de l'esclavage: le ventre de fer et d'argent (1986; transl. 1991 as The Anthropology of Slavery: The Womb of Iron and Gold)
- Anthropologie économique des Gouro de Côte d’Ivoire : De l’économie de subsistance à l’agriculture commerciale. Les ré-impressions. Paris: Éditions de l’École des hautes études en sciences sociales, 2013.
- Meillassoux, Claude, et Christine Verschuur. Entre l’État et les « bandits » armés par l’Afrique du Sud. Les paysans ignorés du Mozambique. Graduate Institute Publications, 2018.

== Articles ==
- "Essai d'interprétation du phénomène économique dans les sociétés traditionnelles d'autosubsistance", Cahiers d'études africaines, 1960, 4: 38–67
- “From Reproduction to Production: A Marxist Approach to Economic Anthropology.” Economy and Society 1(1), 1974
- "Past and future relevance of Marx and Engels' works to anthropology". Dialectical Anthropology 9, 349–356 1985
- Meillassoux, Claude. « De l’incapacité des hommes à accoucher, et ce qu’il en advient ». In Quel genre d’homme ? : Construction sociale de la masculinité, relations de genre et développement, édité par Christine Verschuur, 99‑120. Genre et développement. Rencontres. Genève: Graduate Institute Publications, 2016.
