= Jean Harlez =

Belgian filmmaker (1924–2026)

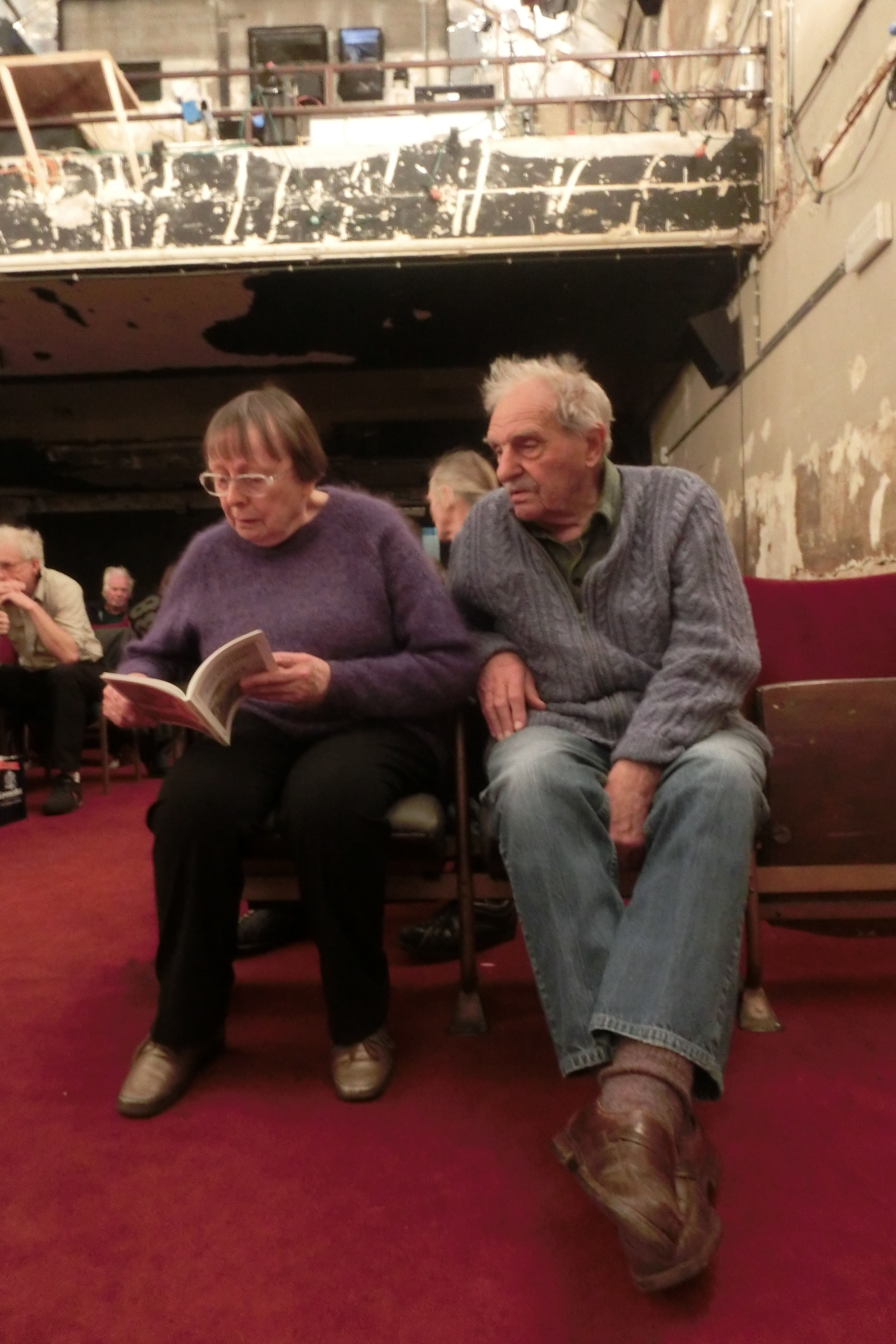
- Harlez and his wife in 2014
- Born: 31 December 1924; Erquelinnes, Belgium
- Died: 15 May 2026 (aged 101)
- Occupation: Filmmaker
- Years active: 1955–2026
- Spouse: Marcelle Dumont

Jean Harlez (31 December 1924 – 15 May 2026) was a Belgian film director who made films in French. He was known for his film Le Chantier des Gosses, filmed in 1956 and eventually released in 1970.

== Early life ==
Jean Harlez was born in Erquelinnes, Belgium on 31 December 1924.

== Career ==
Harlez was the first assistant to Charles Dekeukeleire from 1947 to 1950, and after that he became a filmmaker.

He used a 35mm camera to make a short film on the creation of a peasant cooperative called ''Quand chacun apporte sa part, released in 1954.

Harlez then directed Le Chantier des Gosses which was filmed in Les Marolles, a working-class district of Brussels, between 1956 and 1958 with no sound. After sound was added, the film eventually had its premiere on 30 September 1970 at the Palais des Congrès de Bruxelles. This film turned out to be the first Belgian neorealist film. He also made short documentary film on small trades in Les Marolles, called People of District (1955).

He collaborated with Belgian artist, poet, and filmmaker Marcel Broodthaers, and also worked as cameraman on around a dozen of his films over a period of many years.

Harlez also made a series of films shot in Greenland.

From 1993, Harlez started focusing on his revisited Notre-Dame. These are relief paintings, life-size, where original photos, recovered objects, casts and other various and varied elements are mixed.

== Personal life and death ==
Harlez married Marcelle Dumont, who wrote the scripts for most of his auteur films, from his first film to his latest short fiction films. Harlez died on 15 May 2026, at the age of 101.

== Recognition ==
In early 2014, Le Chantier des Gosses was shown at the Cinéma Nova in Brussels for seven weeks.

In January 2024, as part of a program leading up to its acquisition of a new long lease on 31 March 2024, Cinéma Nova opened its program with a screening of Le chantier des gosses, along with Harlez's first, Quand chacun apporte sa part (1954). Both Harlez and his wife Marcelle Dumont, who was screenwriter for the film, were present at the screening.

== Filmography ==
- Une poupée à la mer (2014)
- Groënland: Voyages au pays blanc (2009)
- Personne à Las Palmas (1990)
- Les conseils de classe, document pour une réflexion (1974)
- Cucugnan, film d'illustration pour le théâtre de l'Équipe (1973)
- Le chantier des gosses (made in 1954–56; soundtrack added and released 1970)
- Les îles Féroé (1968)
- Tupilak, sculpture esquimau du Groënland (1966)
- Igartalik, la vie groenlandaise (1965)
- Ilulissat, Iceberg Et Glacier Groenlandais (1964)
- Bergbeklimming bij middernachtzon (1962)
- À la conquête des sommets polaires (1960)
- Les gens du quartier (1955)
- Quand chacun apporte sa part (1954)
