= Nova Cinema (Brussels) =

Cinema in Brussels, Belgium

- Cinéma Nova
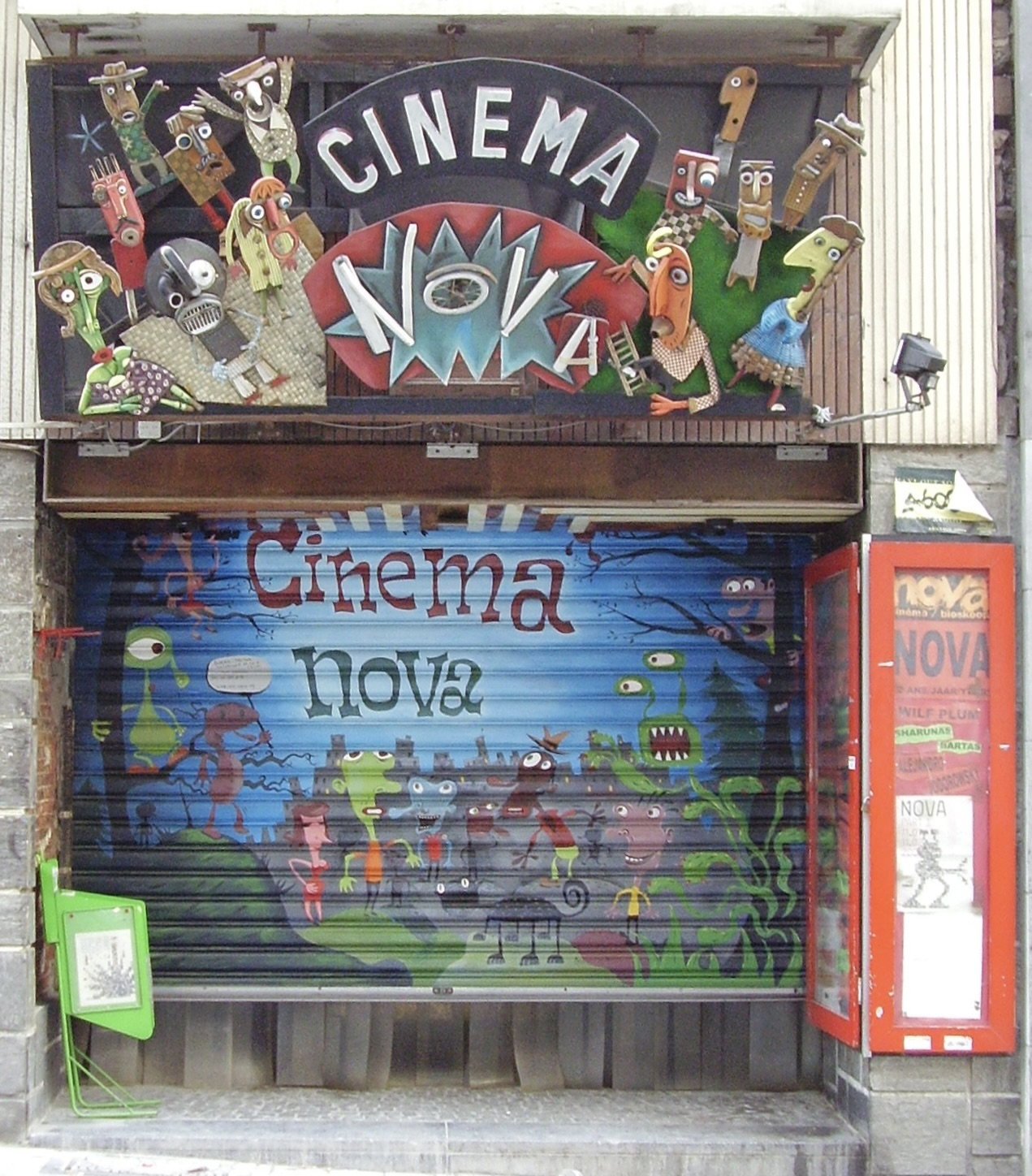
- Entrance to the Nova Cinema
- Interactive map of Nova Cinema
- Address: 3, rue d'Arenberg, 1000 Brussels; Brussels; Belgium
- Coordinates: 50.848342°N 4.356084°E
- Capacity: 200

Website
- www.nova-cinema.org

Nova is a non-profit cinema in Brussels, Belgium, managed by the cooperative Supernova Coop.

== History ==
The cinema opened in January 1997.

The cinema honoured Belgian director Jean Harlez in early 2014, when it screened Harlez' most famous film, Le Chantier des Gosses, for seven weeks.

In January 2024, as part of a program leading up to its acquisition of a new long lease on its premises 31 March 2024, Cinéma Nova opened its program with a screening of Le chantier des gosses, along with Harlez' first, Quand chacun apporte sa part (1954). Both Harlez and his wife Marcelle Dumont, who was screenwriter for the films, were present at the screening.

== Description ==
Supernova Coop is the cooperative associated with the cinema. The cinema is located at 3 rue d'Arenberg.
