= Un Coup de Dés Jamais N'Abolira Le Hasard (Broodthaers) =

Book by Marcel Broodthaers

Un Coup de Dés Jamais N'Abolira Le Hasard, 1969

Un Coup de Dés Jamais N'Abolira Le Hasard (A Throw of the Dice will Never Abolish Chance) is an artist's book by Marcel Broodthaers published November 1969 in Antwerp. The work is a close copy of the first edition of the French Symbolist poet Stéphane Mallarmé's poem of the same name, published in 1914, but with all the words removed, replaced by black stripes that correspond directly to the typographic layout used by Mallarmé to articulate the text.

Broodthaers reduces Un Coup de Dés to its structure - or to put it another way he elevates the structure of the work to a concept worthy of study in its own right, thus acknowledging Mallarmé's own fetishistic attention to this aspect of his work. Rendering the structure concrete, visible, almost tactile, Broodthaers offers a conceptual analysis of Mallarmé's poem across the distance of a nearly a century...It would be hard to imagine a more subtle treatment of Mallarmé's work, or one more capable of demonstrating its essential properties, than this reworked book by Broodthaers. — Johanna Drucker

Often included in exhibitions tracing the history of the artist's book, the work is seen as a seminal example of the European post-avant-garde. It is often referred to simply as Un Coup de Dés.

== Concrete Poetry ==
=== Mallarmé and Magritte ===
Broodthaers had lived in poverty as a poet in Brussels for twenty years before becoming an artist in 1964. His first exhibition, at the Galere Saint-Laurent, included two unsold parcels of his fourth book of poetry, Pense-Bête, encased in plaster. This was the first of many works that 'employed techniques associated with poetry but applied by him not only to words but to images and symbols.' Un Coup de Dés would become the most famous instance of Broodthaers' interest in setting up a contradiction between the written word and a visual image 'to the profit of the subject.'

Broodthaers had been given a copy of Mallarmé's Un Coup de Dés in 1945 by the Belgian surrealist painter René Magritte as 'a way of explaining his art to a young admirer without explaining it literally.'

As for the idea of establishing a direct relationship between literature and the plastic arts, I'm afraid I have done so by taking as a subject A Throw Of The Dice, by Mallarmé !!! — Broodthaers

Mallarmé had written the poem in 1897 and left copious notes as to how it should be typeset, instructions that were finally carried out 16 years after his death, in 1914. The poem was famous for its extraordinary typography, which anticipated the 20th century interest in graphic design and concrete poetry. Mallarmé was known to have organised the layout of the poem using rectangles of card, and to leave written pleas to publish the work exactly as he'd intended. As such, Broodthaers' work can be seen as a direct quote of Mallarmé's working methods and of his obsession with the visual layout of the text.

Mallarmé is the source of all contemporary art... it unconsciously invents modern space. — Broodthaers, 1970

=== The Literary Exhibition ===
Un Coup de Dés Jamais N'Abolira Le Hasard, an inner spread

Broodthaers' exhibition 'Exposition Littéraire autour de Mallarmé' at the Wide White Space Gallery, Antwerp, December 1969 consisted of a copy of Mallarmé's book 'opened so that, (as nearly always when a book is put in an exhibition) only two pages were visible. The meaning is there but cannot be entirely reached.' A series of metal plates, made of anodised aluminium, engraved with black impressions standing in for the text, were hung on the wall whilst a recording of Broodthaers reciting the poem was played continuously for the duration of the exhibition.

The word was "there", more "real", because three dimensional, than the original pages but, of course, negative and illegible. Meanwhile, the tape-recorded voice of the artist read out the poem repeatedly, it was "there" but not simultaneously and continuously present like the words of the poem.

=== The book ===
After a brief introduction citing the original edition published in 1914 by Librairie Gallimard, the book starts with the entire poem written as a block of text which is rectangular if the type of Mallarme's poem is 'regular' and oblique if the type from Mallarme is italic. 12 double spreads follow, with immaculately laid out black shapes standing in for the text. The work is soft bound and feels quite insubstantial. The cover is a near-perfect facsimile of the original cover, but with the word 'image' replacing 'poem' in the centre of the design.

The edition was published in Antwerp to coincide with the exhibition on 25 November 1969. 10 copies of the work - unbound, numbered I-X, printed onto 12 aluminium sheets - were made available, along with 90 copies printed on translucent paper and 300 copies on normal paper. The translucent edition came with two sheets of white card cut to the size of the book so that individual pages could be isolated by the reader if they so wished.

=== Reception of the book ===
The book, like Broodthaers' work in general, has gradually grown in stature since his death in 1976, and has found its way into a number of important collections, including MOMA, V&A, and the Royal Academy of Fine Arts Antwerp. It also has inspired other reworks, like this one by Michalis Pichler: "In Michalis Pichlers’ 2008 rework the blocks are cut out, creating a negative space and geometric pattern of cuts and absence. (...) The idea of remake and of version, using another existing work as point of departure, relieves the artist of the onus of originality while allowing the new gesture to stand as a novel gesture. Un-originality, anti-expressiveness – these are terms that are of more recent vintage than first generation conceptualism."

=== References ===
- Un Coup de Dés Jamais n'Abolira Le Hasard, Broodthaers, 1969
- Marcel Broodthaers, Catalogues des Livres, 1957–75, Galerie Michael Werner, Köln 1982
- Marcel Broodthaers, Tate Gallery, 1980
- Oxford Art Online, Essay on Broodthaers by Michael Compton
- Un Coup de Dés Jamais n'Abolira Le Hasard, Michalis Pichler, Berlin, 2008
- Ubuweb
