= Marcel Broodthaers =

Belgian poet, filmmaker and visual artist

- Born: Marcel Broodthaers; 28 January 1924; Brussels, Belgium
- Died: 28 January 1976 (aged 52); Cologne, Germany
- Known for: Film, poetry, sculpture, artist's book, Installation
- Notable work: Un Coup de Dés Jamais N'Abolira Le Hasard, 1969
- Movement: Conceptual art

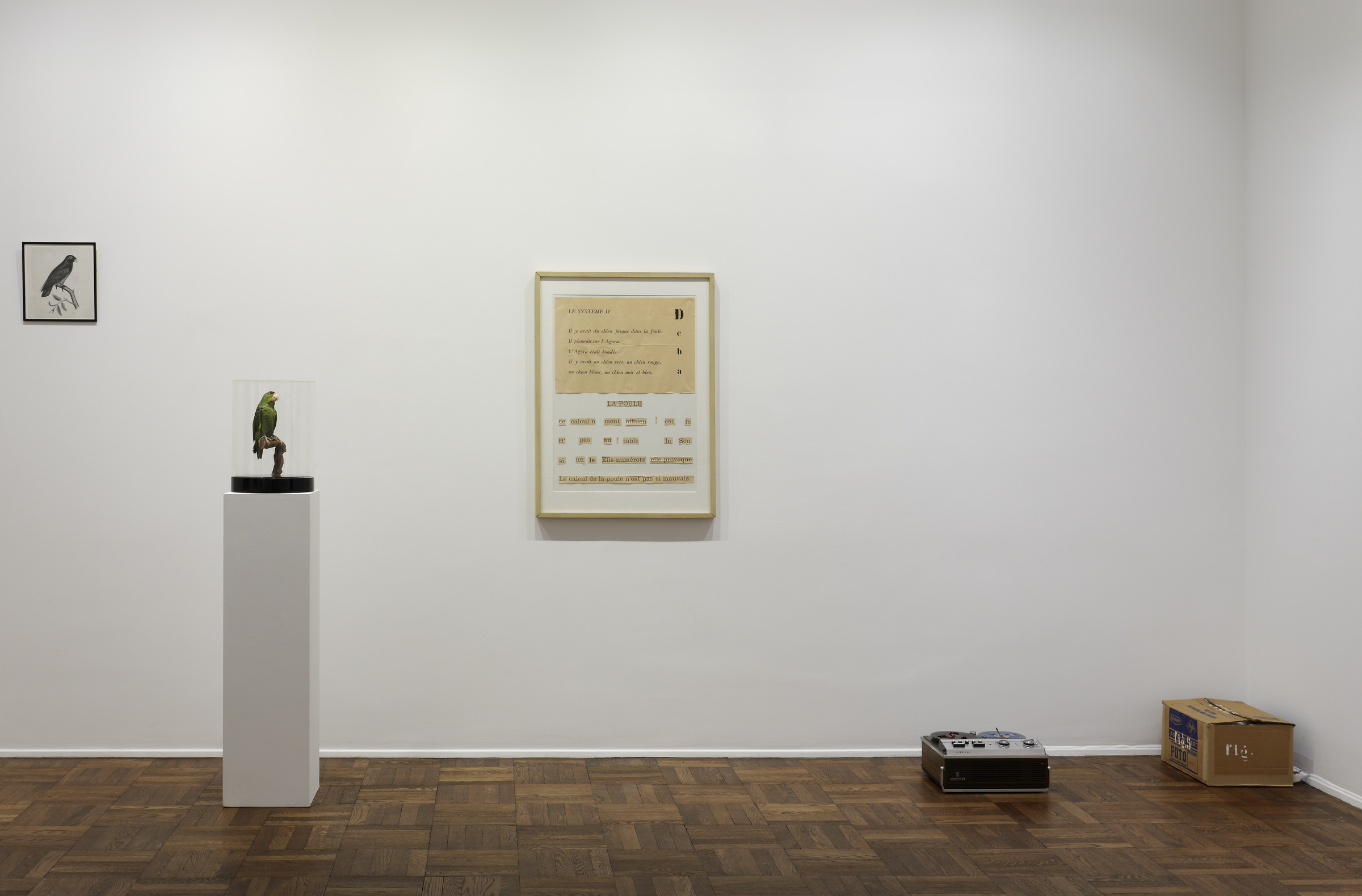
"Dites partout que je l’ai dit", 1974. A décor work by Marcel Broodthaers

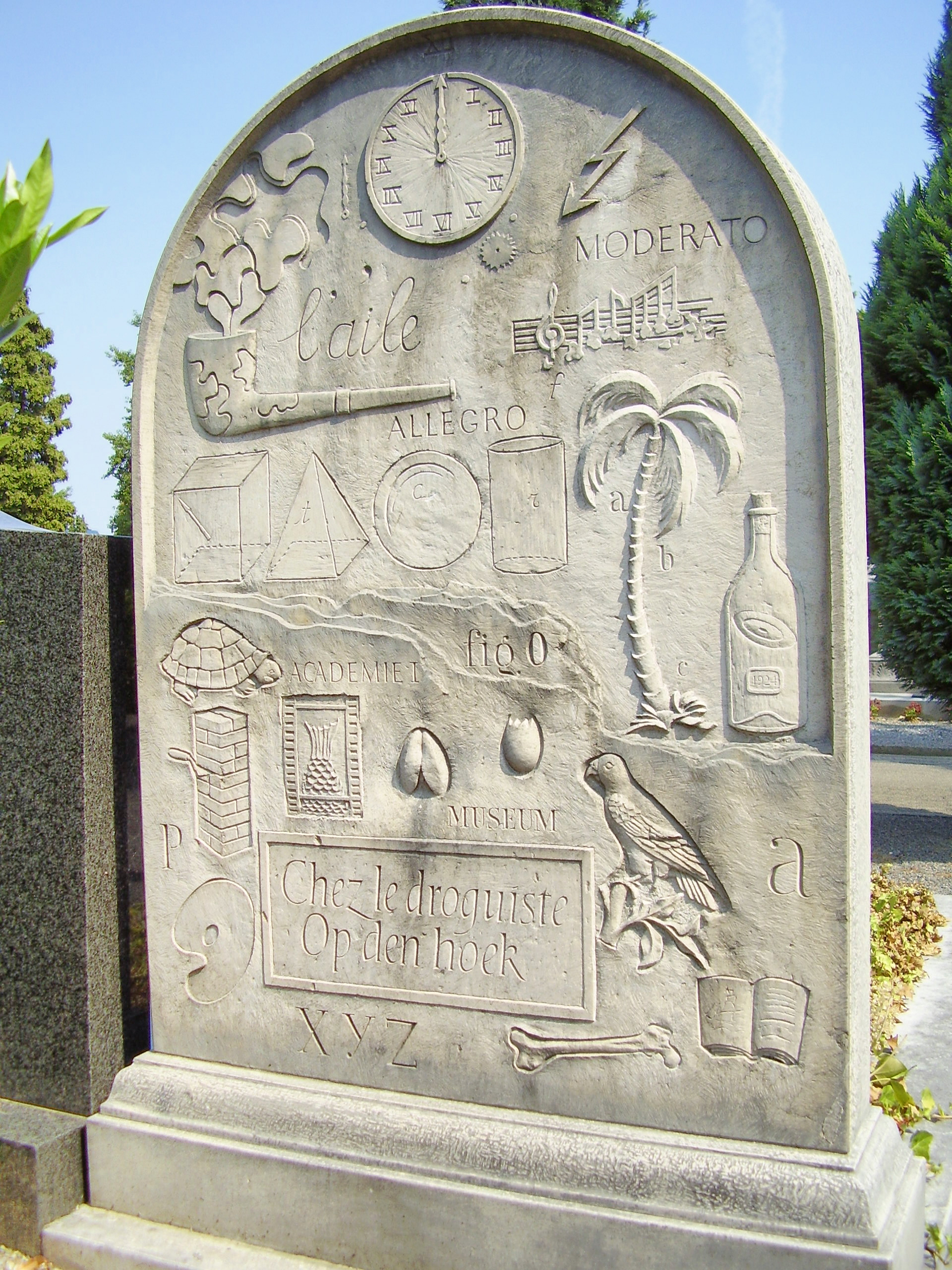
Broodthaers' tombstone, Ixelles Cemetery, Brussels

Marcel Broodthaers (28 January 1924 – 28 January 1976) was a Belgian poet, filmmaker, and visual artist.

== Early life ==
Broodthaers was born on 28 January 1924 in Brussels, Belgium.

== Career ==
Broodthaers was briefly associated with the surrealists after World War II and took part in the beginnings of "surréalisme-revolutionnaire" (revolutionary surrealism) in 1947.

=== Art ===
After spending 20 years in poverty as a struggling poet, at the end of 1963 he decided to become an artist and began to make objects. He performed the symbolic act of embedding fifty unsold copies of his book of poems Pense-Bête in plaster, creating his first art object. That same year, 1964, for his first exhibition, he wrote an infamous introduction that was printed onto pages cut from magazines that doubled as the exhibition's public announcement:

"I, too, wondered whether I could not sell something and succeed in life. For some time I had been no good at anything. I am forty years old... Finally the idea of inventing something insincere crossed my mind and I set to work straightaway. At the end of three months I showed what I had produced to Philippe Edouard Toussaint, the owner of the Galerie St Laurent. 'But it is art' he said 'and I will willingly exhibit all of it.' 'Agreed' I replied. If I sell something, he takes 30%. It seems these are the usual conditions, some galleries take 75%.

What is it? In fact it is objects."

Broodthaers later worked principally with assemblies of found objects and collage, often containing written texts. He incorporated written language in his art and used whatever was at hand for his raw materials—most notably the shells of eggs and mussels, but also furniture, clothing, garden tools, household gadgets and reproductions of artworks. In his Visual Tower (1966), Broodthaers made a seven-story circular tower of wood. He filled each story with uniform glass jars, and in every jar he placed an identical image taken from an illustrated magazine, of the eye of a beautiful young woman. For Surface de moules (avec sac) (Surface of mussels (with bag)) (1966), he glued mussels in resin on a square panel; in 1974 the artist added a discreet metal hook to the centre of the work designed to support a shopping bag filled with mussel shells.

From 1968 to 1975 Broodthaers produced large-scale environmental pieces that reworked the very notion of the museum. His most noted work was an installation which began in his Brussels house which he called Musée d'Art Moderne, Départment des Aigles (1968), containing different representations of eagles in glass cases that were accompanied by signs that asserted "This is not a work of art", implying that museums obscure the ideological functioning of images by imposing illegitimate classifications of value. This installation was followed by a further eleven manifestations of the 'museum', including at the Kunsthalle Düsseldorf for an exhibition in 1970 and at documenta 5 in Kassel in 1972. In 1970 Broodthaers conceived of the Financial Section, which encompassed an attempt to sell the museum "on account of bankruptcy." The sale was announced on the cover of the Art Cologne fair catalogue in 1971, but no buyers were found. As part of the Financial Section, the artist also produced an unlimited edition of gold ingots stamped with the museum's emblem, an eagle, a symbol associated with power and victory. The ingots were sold to raise money for the museum, at a price calculated by doubling the market value of gold, the surcharge representing the bar's value as art.

In 1974, Broodthaers launched three separate exhibitions in the same week, each consisting of a new type of installation artwork he referred to as "décors". The venues of these exhibitions were Wide White Space in Antwerp, Catalogue-Catalogus at Palais de Beaux-Arts Brussels, and Eloge du sujet at Kunstmuseum Basel. In 1975 Broodthaers presented the exhibition "L’Angelus de Daumier" at the Centre National d’Art Contemporain in Paris, at which each room had the name of a colour. In La Salle Blanche (The White Room) (1975), a life-size copy of a room and a half in Broodthaers' home in Brussels, the wooden walls of the empty, unfurnished rooms are covered with printed words in French—such as museum, gallery, oil, subject, composition, images, and privilege—all intended to examine "the influence of language on perceptions of the world and the ways museums affect the production and consumption of art." For such works he is associated with the late 20th century global spread of both installation art as well as "institutional critique," in which interrelationships between artworks, the artist, and the museum are a focus. Indeed, Broodthaers' Musée d'Art Moderne, his "first fictional museum," allowed him to simultaneously posture as artist, director, curator and trustee in a self-reflexive examination of the order and prescriptions implicit in the production of museum exhibits. In 2019, The New York Times cited Musée d'Art Moderne, Départment des Aigles as one of the 25 works of art that defined the contemporary age.

=== Films ===
Broodthaers made his first film in 1957, and from 1967 he produced over 50 short films in documentary, narrative, and experimental styles. He collaborated with Belgian director Jean Harlez, who also worked as cameraman on around a dozen of his films over a period of many years.

=== Publishing ===
As a poet and political activist, Broodthaers had a life-long interest in the circulatory power of printed matter: posters, graphics, editions, and artist books. In addition to the prospect of commercial galleries selling limited editions, the artist's books Broodthaers published with institutions like Kunsthalle Düsseldorf, the Deutsche Academischer Austaudienst (DAAD), Berlin, the Museum of Modern Art, Oxford, and the Centre Pompidou, Paris, merged his profit ambitions with his nonprofit conceptual and philosophical ideas. For example, Broodthaers' catalogue for Der Adler von Oligizän bis heute, the seminal culmination of his Musee d'Art Moderne, department des Aigles, at Kunstalle Düsseldorf in 1972, was published in two volumes. Volume I featured a scholarly index of the items on display and was for sale at the opening of the exhibition, replete with a coupon that could be redeemed later for Volume II, which featured views of the installation and came out at the close of the exhibition.

Broodthaers returned to this motif for his artist's book Photographieren Verboten/No Photographs Allowed but aimed it at the convention of the exhibition catalogue, with version one published by the DAAD, Berlin, and version two by the Museum of Modern Art, Oxford. The Oxford book presents ostensibly the same content as the DAAD book but scrambles the internal logic of the book, changing the context of its standard component parts—title page, checklist, scholarly essay, curriculum vitae—and thus the implications of each. Content normally reserved for the rear of an exhibition catalogue (in this case the artist's cv) appears on the inside front cover as a decorative pattern, and scholarly content such as the catalogue essay appears on the outside back cover like an advertising blurb.

== Later life and death ==
From late 1969, Broodthaers lived mainly in Düsseldorf, Berlin, and finally London.

He died on 28 January 1976 in Cologne, Germany, of a liver disease, on his 52nd birthday. He is buried at Ixelles Cemetery in Brussels under a tombstone of his own design which was realized by sculptor Karel Van Roy in Beernem, Belgium.

== Exhibitions ==
In 1980, the exhibition "Marcel Broodthaers" was mounted by the Tate Gallery, London. Other important retrospectives of Broodthaers' work have been held at the Walker Art Center (1989), Museum of Contemporary Art, Los Angeles (1989); Carnegie Museum of Art, Pittsburgh (1989); Jeu de Paume, Paris (1991); and Palais des Beaux Arts, Brussels (2000), Fridericianum, Kassel, Germany (2015), and M HKA, Antwerp (2019), an upcoming retrospective commemorating 50 years of his passing will happen in September 2026 in LondonBelmacz. The most recent traveling survey was organized by the Museum of Modern Art, New York and the Museo Nacional Centro de Arte Reina Sofía, Madrid in 2016, which travelled to the Kunstsammlung Nordrhein-Westfalen, Düsseldorf in 2017. An important solo exhibition of the film work, "Marcel Broodthaers: Cinéma", was shown at Fundació Antoni Tàpies, Barcelona; Centro Galego de Arte Contemporánea, Santiago de Compostela, and Kunsthalle Düsseldorf in (1997).

There have been many notable international group exhibitions, including documenta 5, 7 and 10, Kassel (1972, 1982, and 1997). Notable recent group shows include The Artist as Poet: Selections from Pamm's Collection, in 2021-2022, at Pérez Art Museum Miami.
