= University of Maryland, College Park =

Public university in College Park, Maryland, US

- Former names: Maryland Agricultural College (1856–1916); Maryland State College (1916–1920)
- Type: Public land-grant research university
- Established: March 6, 1856; 170 years ago
- Parent institution: University System of Maryland
- Accreditation: MSCHE
- Academic affiliations: AAU; CUWMA; ORAU; U21; UARC; URA; Sea-grant; Space-grant
- Endowment: $2.10 billion (2023) (system-wide)
- President: Darryll Pines
- Provost: Jennifer King Rice
- Academic staff: 4,474 (fall 2023)
- Administrative staff: 6,216 (fall 2023)
- Total staff: 14,922 (fall 2023)
- Students: 40,792 (fall 2022)
- Undergraduates: 30,353 (fall 2022)
- Postgraduates: 10,439 (fall 2022)
- Location: College Park, Maryland, United States; 38°59′17″N 76°56′33″W
- Campus: 1,340 acres (5.4 km^{2}); Large suburb
- Newspaper: The Diamondback
- Colors: Red, gold, white, and black
- Nickname: Terrapins
- Sporting affiliations: NCAA Division I FBS – Big Ten
- Mascot: Testudo the Terrapin
- Website: umd.edu

The University of Maryland, College Park (University of Maryland, UMD, or simply Maryland) is a public land-grant research university in College Park, Maryland, United States. Founded in 1856, UMD is the flagship institution of the University System of Maryland.

The University of Maryland is the largest university in Maryland and in the Washington metropolitan area. Its eleven schools and colleges offer over 200 degree-granting programs, including 113 undergraduate majors, 107 master's programs, and 83 doctoral programs. UMD's athletic teams are known as the Maryland Terrapins and compete in NCAA Division I as a member of the Big Ten Conference.

The University of Maryland is a member of the Association of American Universities and its proximity to Washington, D.C., has resulted in many research partnerships with the federal government. It is classified among "R1: Doctoral Universities – very high research activity" and has been established as a "Public Ivy". According to the National Science Foundation, the university spent a combined $1.14 billion on research and development in 2021, ranking it 17th among American universities.

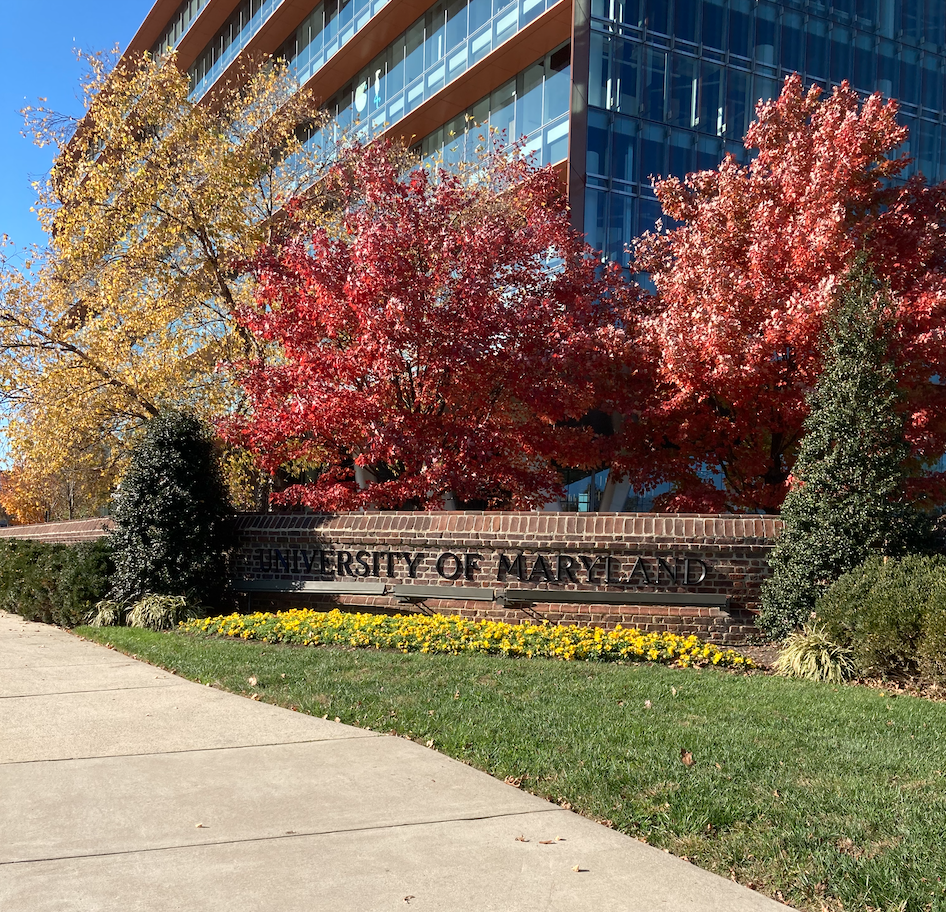
Northeast entrance to the University of Maryland Campus

== History ==
=== Early history ===
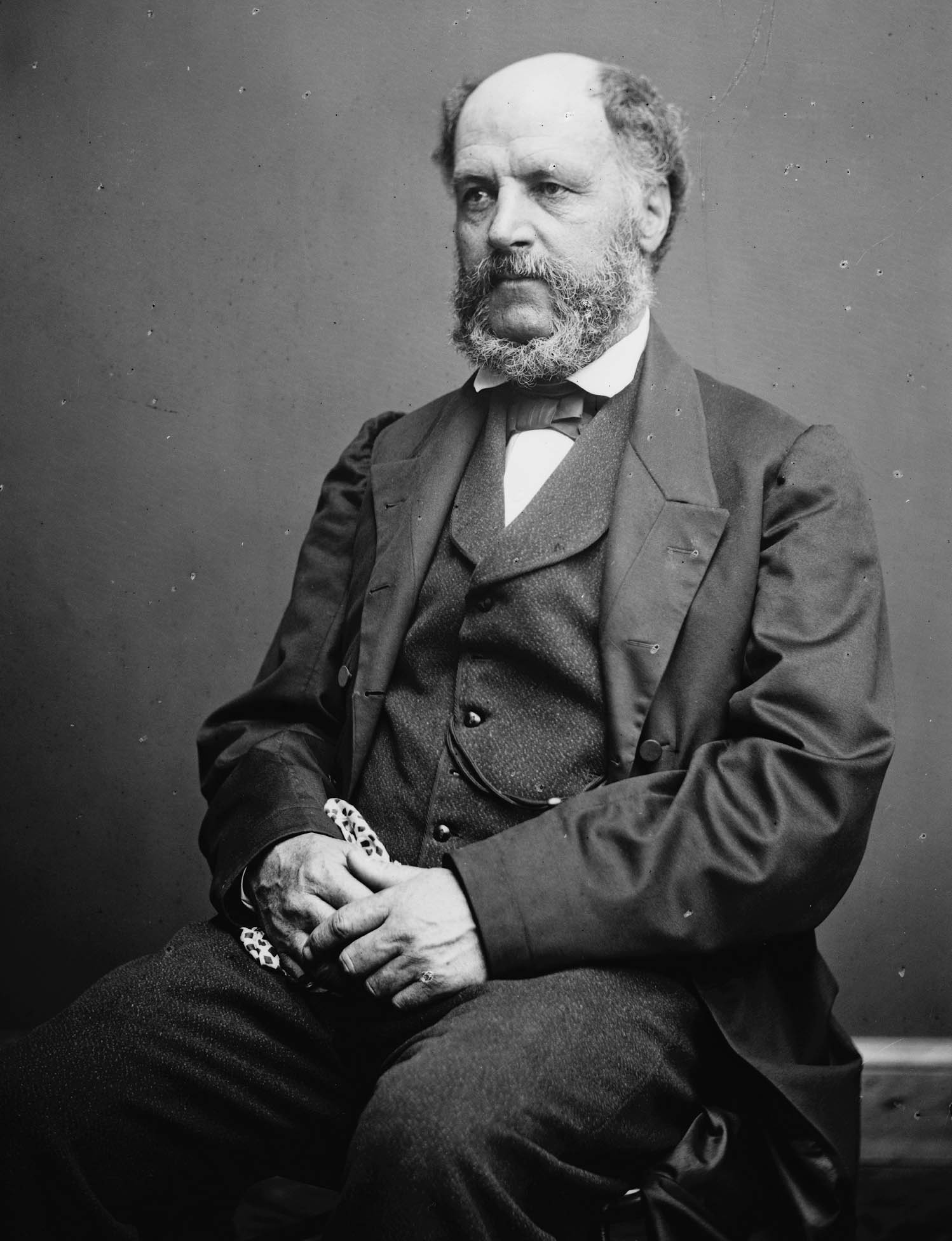
Charles Benedict Calvert (1808–1864), founder of the forerunner Maryland Agricultural College

On March 6, 1856, the forerunner of today's University of Maryland was chartered as the Maryland Agricultural College. Two years later, Charles Benedict Calvert (1808–1864), a future U.S. Representative (Congressman) and descendant of the first Lord Baltimore, purchased 420 acres (1.7 km^{2}) of the Riversdale Mansion estate nearby today's College Park, Maryland. Later that year, Calvert founded the school and was the acting president from 1859 to 1860. On October 5, 1859, the first 34 students entered the Maryland Agricultural College. The school became a land grant college in February 1864.

=== Civil War ===
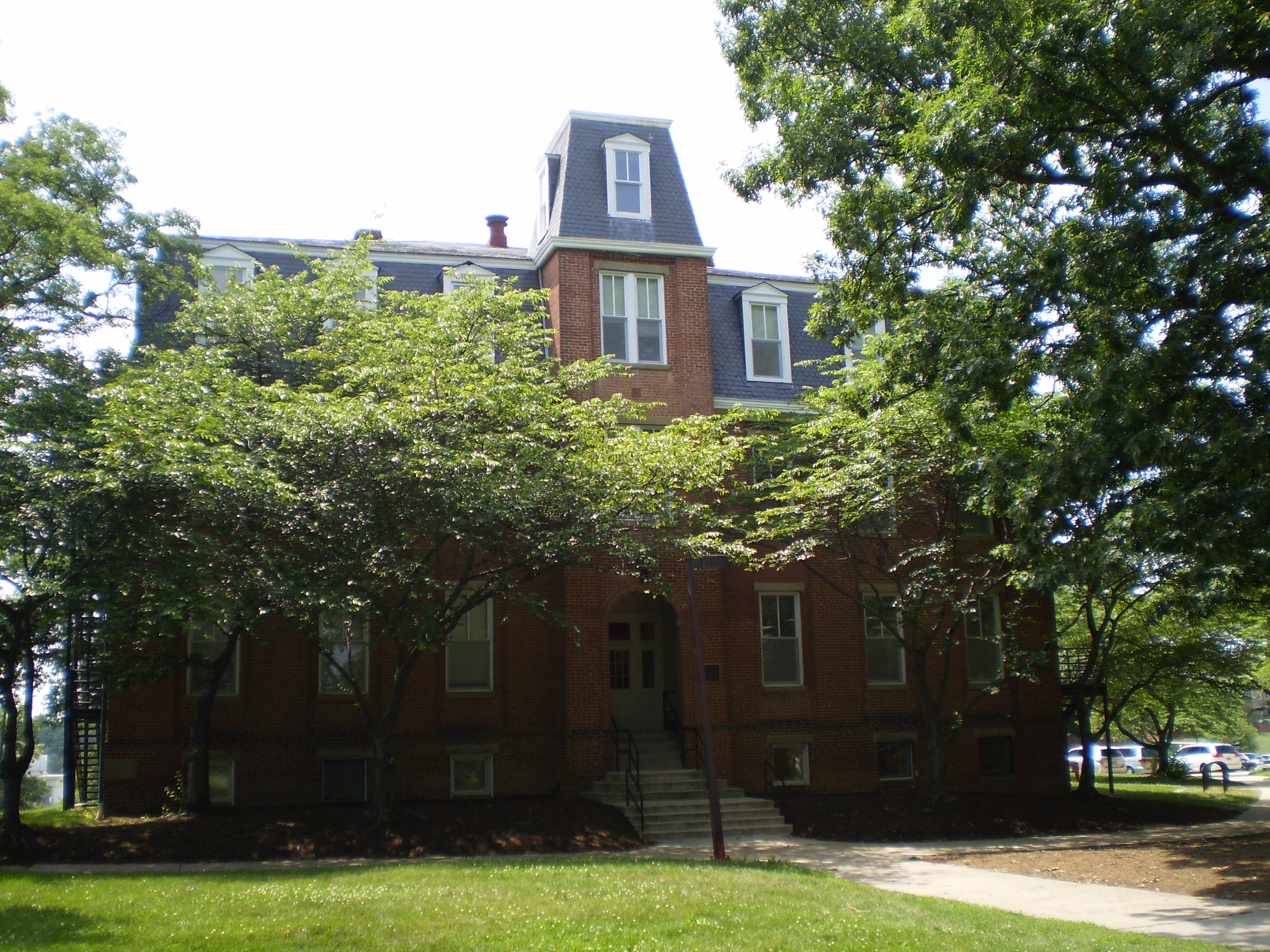
Morrill Hall, built in 1898, the oldest academic building on campus.

During the Civil War, Confederate soldiers under Brigadier General Bradley Tyler Johnson moved past the college on July 12, 1864, as part of Jubal Early's raid on Washington, D.C. By the end of the war, financial problems forced the administrators to sell off 200 acres (81 ha) of land, and the continuing decline in enrollment sent the Maryland Agricultural College into bankruptcy. The campus was used as a boys' preparatory school for the next two years.

The Maryland legislature assumed half ownership of the school in 1866. The college thus became, in part, a state institution. By October 1867, the school reopened with 11 students. In 1868, the former Confederate admiral Franklin Buchanan was appointed president of the school. Enrollment grew to 80 at the time of his resignation, and the school soon paid off its debt. In 1873, Samuel Jones, a former Confederate Major General, became president of the college.

Twenty years later, the federally-funded Agricultural Experiment Station was established there. During this same period, state laws granted the college regulatory powers in several areas—including controlling farm disease, inspecting feed, establishing a state weather bureau and geological survey, and housing the forestry board. Morrill Hall (the oldest instructional building still in use on campus) was built the following year.

=== Great Fire of 1912 ===
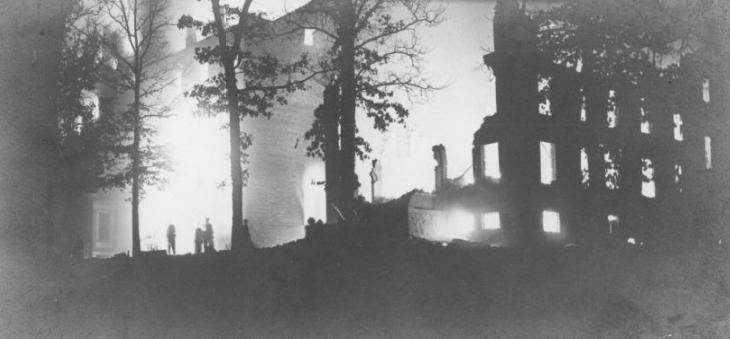
The Great Fire of 1912

On November 29, 1912, a fire destroyed student housing, school records, and most of the academic buildings, leaving only Morrill Hall untouched. There were no injuries or fatalities, and all but two students returned to the university and insisted on classes continuing. The first building built after the fire was Calvert Hall in 1914. A new administration building was not built until the 1940s.

=== Twentieth century ===
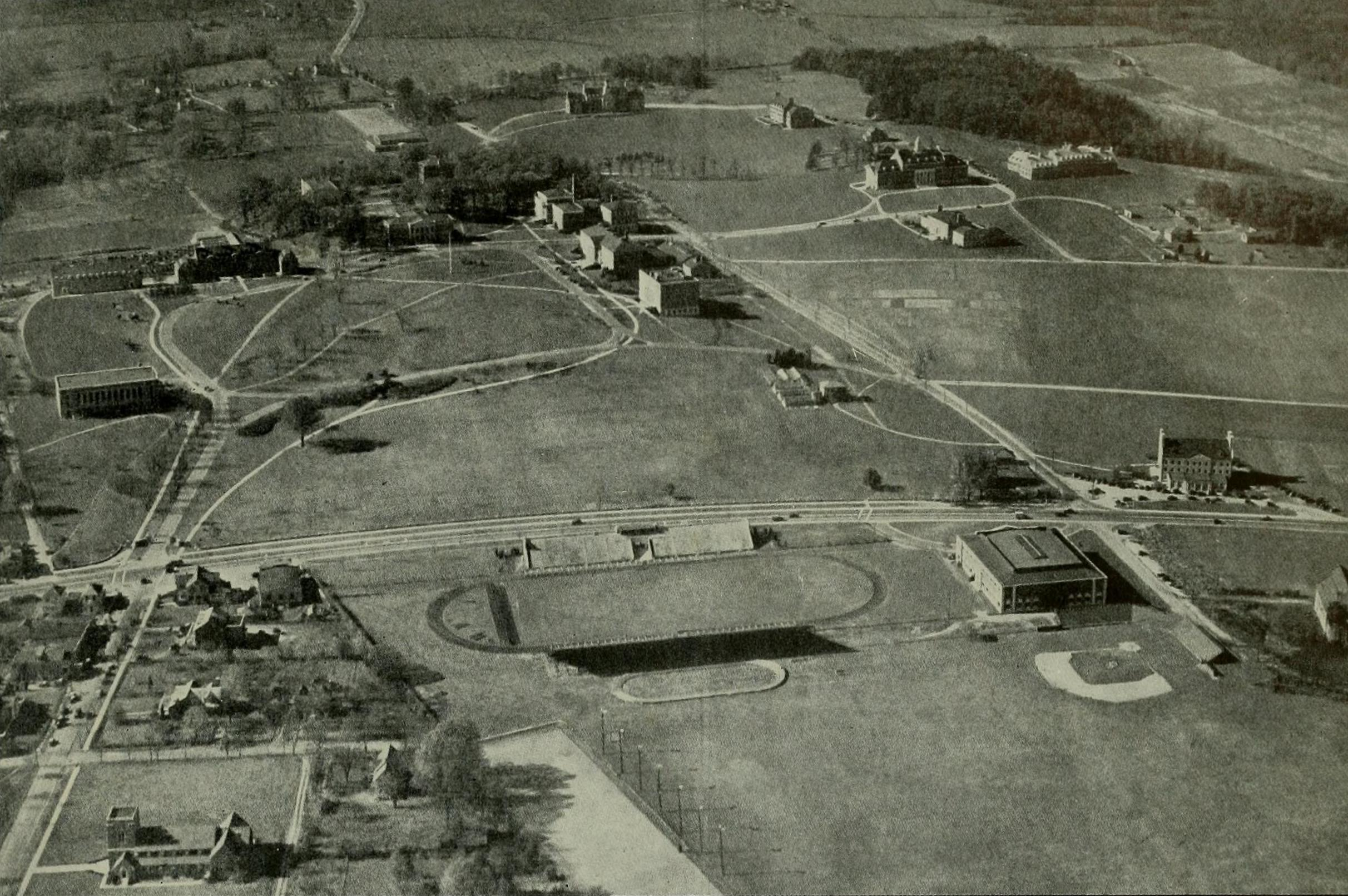
The University of Maryland campus in 1938

During Phillips Lee Goldsborough's tenure as Governor of Maryland, the state purchased Maryland Agricultural College, taking control of the school in 1916 and renaming it Maryland State College. In the same year, the first female students, Elizabeth Gambrill Hook and Charlotte Ann Vaux, enrolled at the school. On April 9, 1920, the college became part of the existing University of Maryland, replacing St. John's College, Annapolis as the university's undergraduate campus. In the same year, the graduate school on the College Park campus awarded its first Ph.D. degrees and the university's enrollment reached 500 students. In 1925 the university was accredited by the Association of American Universities.

By the time the first black students enrolled at the university in 1951, enrollment had grown to nearly 10,000 students—4,000 of whom were women. Before 1951, many black students in Maryland were enrolled at the University of Maryland, Eastern Shore.

In 1957, President Wilson H. Elkins pushed to increase the university's academic standards. His efforts resulted in creating one of the first Academic Probation Plans. The first year the plan went into effect, 1,550 students (18% of the total student body) faced expulsion.

On October 19, 1957, Queen Elizabeth II of the United Kingdom attended her first and only college football game at the University of Maryland after expressing interest in seeing a typically American sport during her first tour of the United States. The Maryland Terrapins beat the North Carolina Tar Heels 21 to 7 in the historical game now referred to as "The Queen's Game".

Phi Beta Kappa established a chapter at The University of Maryland in 1964. In 1969, the university was elected to the Association of American Universities. The school continued to grow, and by the fall of 1985 reached an enrollment of 38,679. Like many colleges during the Vietnam War, the university was the site of student protests and had curfews enforced by the National Guard.

In 1981, Barbara A. Williams became the first Black woman in the country to earn a Ph.D. in astronomy.

In a massive restructuring of the state's higher education system in 1988, the school was designated as the flagship campus of the newly formed University of Maryland System (later changed to the University System of Maryland in 1997). It was formally named the University of Maryland, College Park. All five campuses in the former network were designated distinct campuses in the new system. However, in 1997 the Maryland General Assembly passed legislation allowing the University of Maryland, College Park, to be known simply as the University of Maryland, recognizing the campus' role as the flagship institution of the University System of Maryland.

In 1994, the National Archives at College Park completed construction and opened on a parcel of land adjoining the campus donated by the University of Maryland, after lobbying by President William Kirwan and congressional leaders to foster academic collaboration between the institutions.

=== Twenty-first century ===
In 2004, the university began constructing the 150-acre (61 ha) "M Square Research Park", which includes facilities affiliated with the U.S. Department of Defense, Food and Drug Administration, and the new National Center for Weather and Climate Prediction, affiliated with the National Oceanic and Atmospheric Administration (NOAA). In May 2010, ground was broken on a new Physical Science Complex, including an advanced quantum science laboratory.

The university experienced multiple data breaches in 2014. The first resulted in the compromise of over 300,000 student and faculty records. A second data breach occurred several months later. The second breach was investigated by the FBI and Secret Service and found to be done by David Helkowski. Despite the attribution, no charges were filed. As a result of the data breaches, the university offered free credit protection for five years to the students and faculty affected.

In 2017, the university received a record-breaking donation of $219.5 million from the A. James & Alice B. Clark Foundation, ranking among the country's largest philanthropic gifts to a public university. Darryll J. Pines became the 34th president of the university in 2020. Pines was a professor of Aerospace Engineering at the university before becoming president.

In 2021, the university announced it had raised $1.5 billion in donations since 2018.

In April 2024, UMD students joined other campuses across the United States in protests against the Gaza war. Students called attention to the genocide in Palestine and for the university to divest from companies that support the Gaza war. Activism continued in the next academic year with the placement of small flags in the lawn on McKeldin Mall, representing the more than 150,000 Palestinians killed in Gaza.

== Campus ==
Map of the University of Maryland, College Park's campus Academic instruction Administration and services Arts venues Housing and dining Open spaces Sports and recreation University of Maryland, College Park boundary

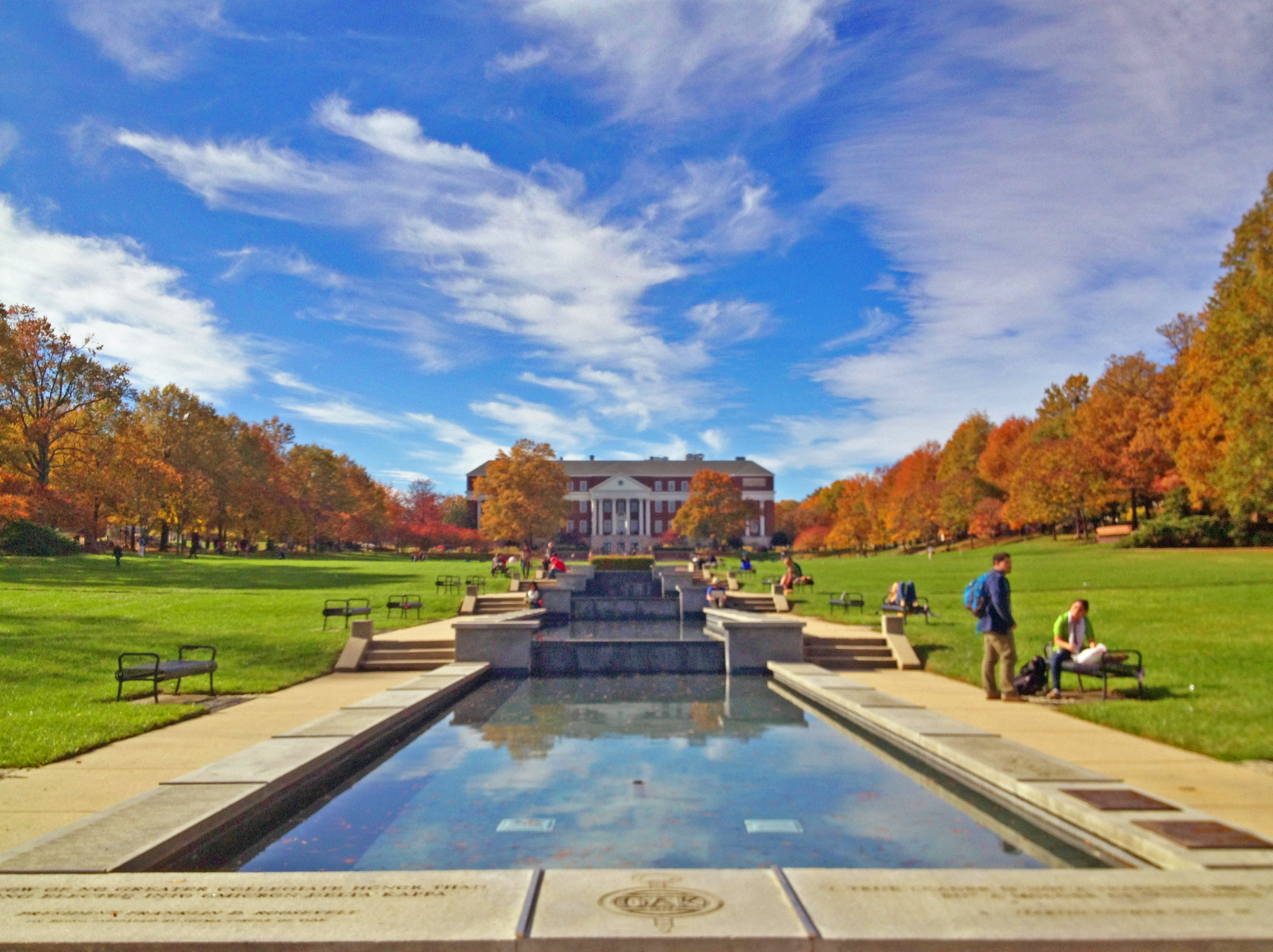
McKeldin Mall in autumn

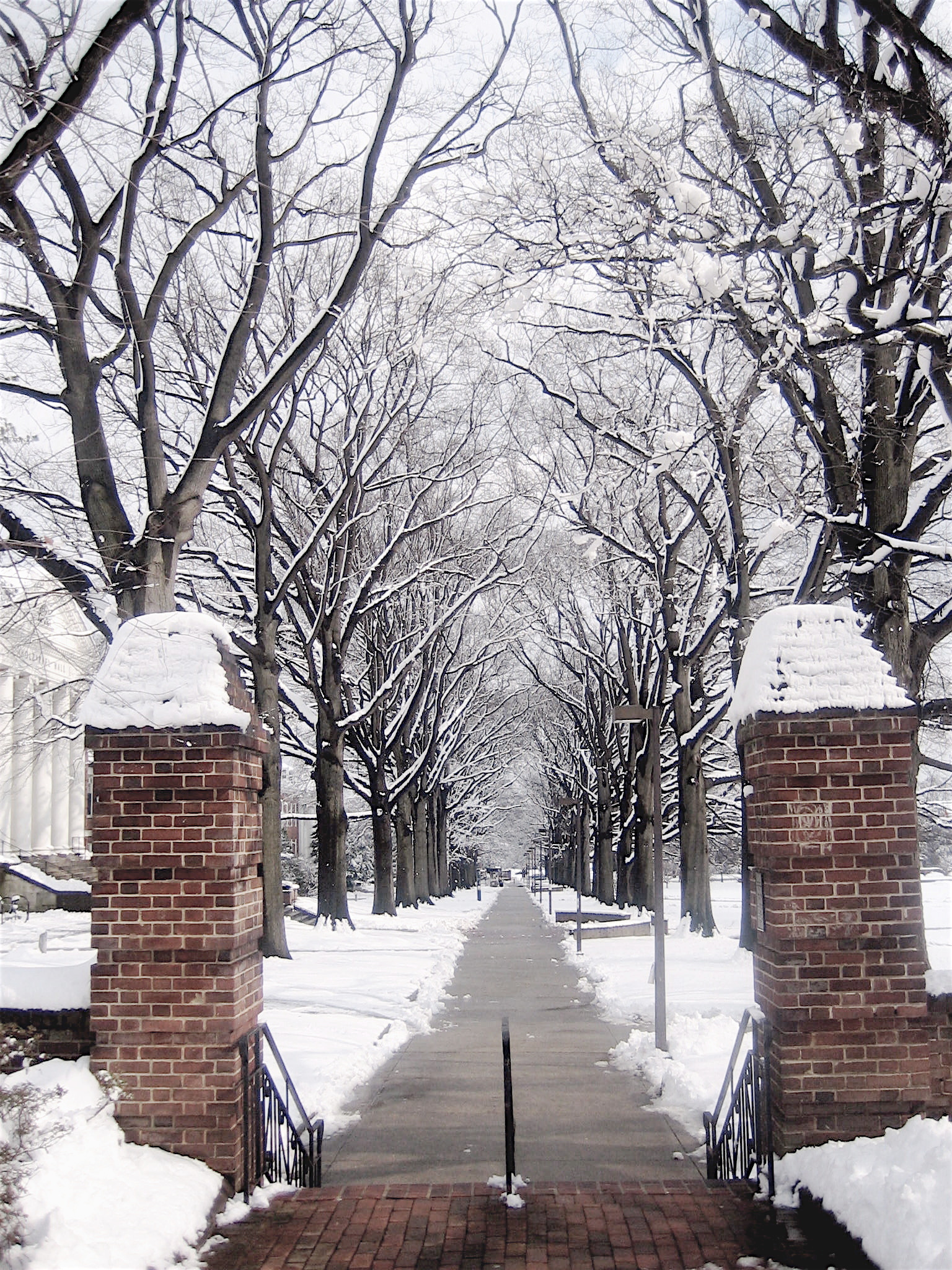
Campus walkway in the winter

The center of the university's 1,250 acres (5.1 km^{2}) is McKeldin Mall, which is the largest academic mall in the United States. The Mall is bordered on the west and east by McKeldin Library and the Thomas V. Miller, Jr. Administration Building, respectively. Academic buildings surround McKeldin Mall on the north and south ends. They are the homes to many departments in the College of Behavioral and Social Sciences, College of Arts and Humanities, and the College of Agriculture and Natural Resources. South of McKeldin Mall are the North Hill Community, at the southwesterly corner, and the original center of campus, Morrill Hall and the Morrill Quad. South of the Morrill Quad are the South Hill and South Campus Commons Communities, and the Southwest Mall and the Robert H. Smith School of Business to the southwest.

Running parallel to McKeldin Mall to the north is Campus Drive, the main thoroughfare through campus. Another thoroughfare, Regents Drive, runs perpendicular to the Mall and is home to the Memorial Chapel and the Campus Farms. Regents Drive crosses Campus Drive at the campus hallmark, The "M", which is a mound with a large "M" formed by flowers in its center. The northeast quadrant of campus, formed by Campus and Regent Drives, is home to many of natural sciences and applied sciences departments. The Rossborough Inn, which was built during the years 1798 to 1812, is the oldest building on campus (and is older than the university itself). There are five regularly used entrances to campus; the main entrance, off of Baltimore Avenue and onto Campus Drive, is referred to as North Gate and features the Gatehouse, an ornate gateway honoring the university's founders. The 140-acre (57 ha), 18-hole University of Maryland Golf Course sits at the northern edge of campus, as does the Observatory.

The campus contains 7,500 documented trees and garden plantings, leading the American Public Gardens Association to designate the campus the University of Maryland Arboretum & Botanical Garden in 2008. There are also nearly 400 acres (1.6 km^{2}) of urban forest on campus and the Arbor Day Foundation has named the university to its 'Tree Campus USA' list. The recreational Paint Branch Trail, part of the Anacostia Tributary Trails system, cuts through campus, as does the Paint Branch stream, a tributary of the Northeast Branch Anacostia River. The university's first Leed Gold building, Knight Hall, opened in April 2010 as the new home for the Philip Merrill College of Journalism. In 2021, President Pines pledged that the University of Maryland would achieve carbon neutrality by Earth Day 2025.

== Academics ==
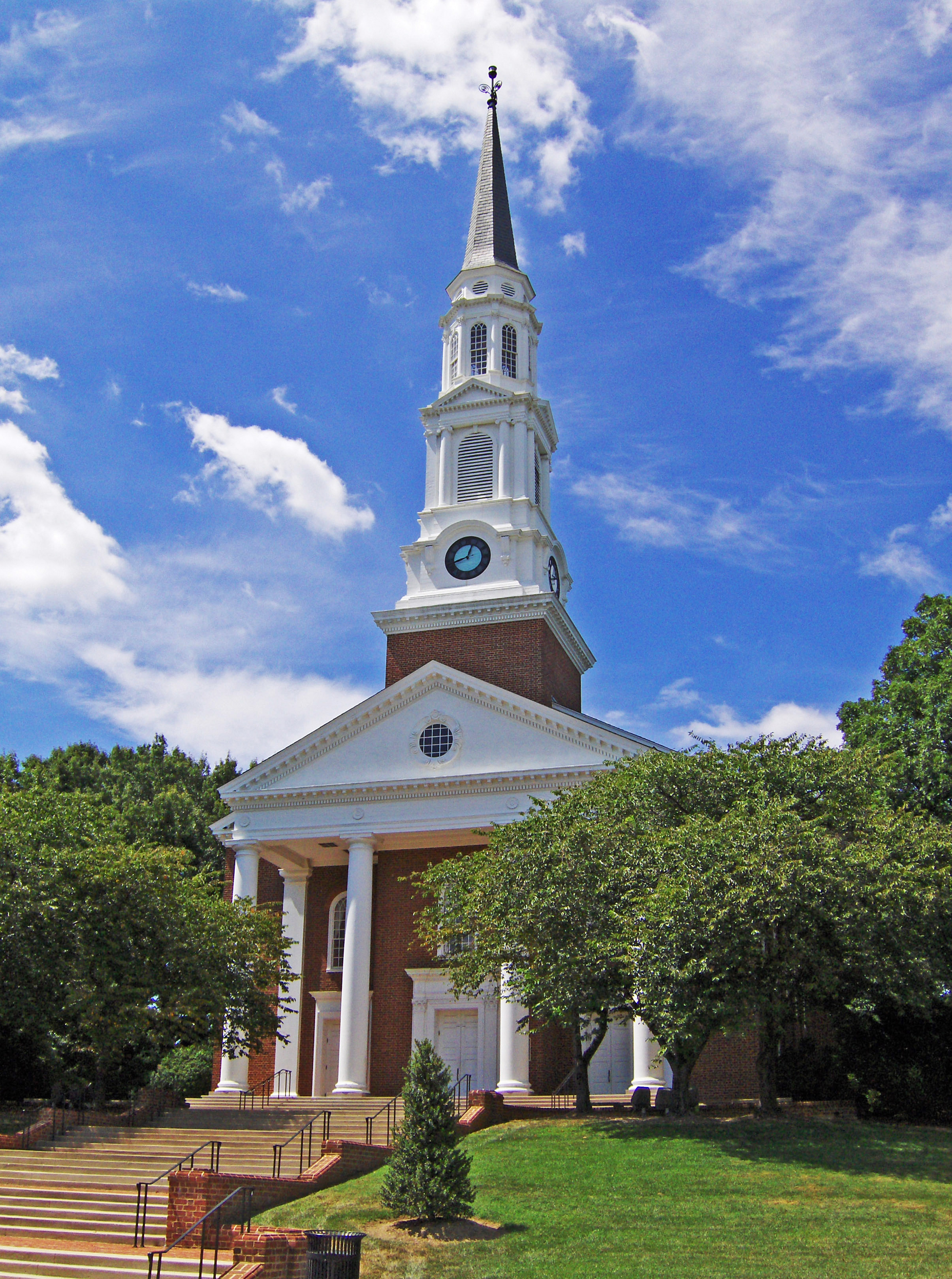
Memorial Chapel

The University of Maryland offers 127 undergraduate degrees and 112 graduate degrees in twelve colleges and schools:

- A. James Clark School of Engineering
- College of Agriculture and Natural Resources
  - Virginia-Maryland Regional College of Veterinary Medicine
- College of Arts and Humanities
  - School of Languages, Literatures, and Cultures
  - School of Music
- College of Behavioral and Social Sciences
- College of Computer, Mathematical, and Natural Sciences
- College of Education
- College of Information Studies
- Philip Merrill College of Journalism
- Robert H. Smith School of Business
- School of Architecture, Planning & Preservation
- School of Public Health
- School of Public Policy
- Office of Undergraduate Studies
- The Graduate School

=== Undergraduate admissions ===
Undergraduate admissions statistics
- 2022 entering class
- Admit rate: 34.3 (▼ −10.2)
- Yield rate: 24.4 (▼ −3.1)

Test scores middle 50%^{[i]}
- SAT Total: 1380-1520 (among 49% of FTFs)
- ACT Composite: 31-34 (among 8% of FTFs)

Admission to Maryland is rated "most selective" by U.S. News & World Report. For the Class of 2026 (enrolled fall 2022), Maryland received 56,766 applications and accepted 19,451 (34.3%). Of those accepted, 4,742 enrolled, a yield rate (the percentage of accepted students who choose to attend the university) of 24.4%. Maryland's freshman retention rate is 95.5%, with 88.3% going on to graduate within six years.

Maryland is a test-optional university and students can decide whether or not to submit SAT or ACT scores. Of the 34% of the incoming freshman class who submitted SAT scores, the middle 50 percent Composite scores were 1340–1490. Of the 9% of enrolled freshmen in 2021 who submitted ACT scores, the middle 50 percent Composite score was between 30 and 34.

The University of Maryland, College Park is a college sponsor of the National Merit Scholarship Program and sponsored 58 Merit Scholarship awards in 2020. In the 2020–2021 academic year, 69 freshman students were National Merit Scholars.

Fall first-time freshman statistics
	2022	2021	2020	2019	2018	2017
Applicants	56,766	50,306	32,211	32,987	33,461	33,907
Admits	19,451	20,382	16,437	14,560	15,760	15,081
Admit rate	34.3	40.5	51.1	44.1	47.1	44.5
Enrolled	4,742	4,861	4,313	4,285	4,712	4,141
Yield rate	24.4	23.8	26.2	29.4	30.0	27.5
ACT composite* (out of 36)	31–34 (8%^{†})	30–34 (9%^{†})	29–34 (28%^{†})	29–33 (31%^{†})	28–33 (35%^{†})	29–33 (45%^{†})
SAT composite* (out of 1600)	1380–1520 (49%^{†})	1340–1490 (34%^{†})	1290–1460 (84%^{†})	1290–1460 (82%^{†})	1290–1480 (81%^{†})	1290–1470 (75%^{†})
* middle 50% range^{†} percentage of first-time freshmen who chose to submit

In 2020, the university announced it was joining the Common App. Beginning with the 2017–18 admissions cycle, the University of Maryland uses the application provided by The Coalition for Access, Affordability, and Success.

=== Rankings ===
Academic rankings

National
- Forbes: 34- 12th in public universities
- U.S. News & World Report: 42
- Washington Monthly: 82
- WSJ/College Pulse: 75

Global
- ARWU: 55
- QS: =207
- THE: =112
- U.S. News & World Report: =72

USNWR graduate school rankings
Biological Sciences	62
Business	44
Chemistry	41
Clinical Psychology	33
Computer Science	16
Criminology	1
Earth Sciences	28
Economics	21
Education	27
Engineering	20
English	30
Fine Arts	110
History	27
Library & Information Studies	8
Mathematics	22
Physics	14
Political Science	29
Psychology	39
Public Affairs	32
Public Health	32
Sociology	24
Speech–Language Pathology	16

In the 2026 U.S. News & World Report rankings of universities, the University of Maryland is 42nd in "National Universities" and 16th in "Top Public Schools". The Academic Ranking of World Universities ranked Maryland as 43rd in the world in 2015. The 2017–2018 Times Higher Education World University Rankings placed Maryland 69th worldwide. The 2016/17 QS World University Rankings ranked Maryland 131st worldwide.

The university was ranked among Peace Corps' 25 Top Volunteer-Producing Colleges for the tenth consecutive year in 2020. The University of Maryland is ranked among Teach for America's Top 20 Colleges and Universities, contributing the greatest number of graduating seniors to its 2017 teaching corps.

For the fourth consecutive year in 2015, the university was ranked first in the U.S. for the number of Boren Scholarship recipients – with nine students receiving awards for intensive international language study. The university is ranked as a Top Producing Institution of Fulbright U.S. Students and Scholars for the 2017–2018 academic year by the United States Department of State's Bureau of Educational and Cultural Affairs.

In 2017, the University of Maryland was ranked among the top 50 universities in the 2018 Best Global Universities Rankings by U.S. News & World Report based on its high academic research performance and global reputation.

In 2021, the university was ranked among the top 10 universities in The Princeton Review's annual survey of the Top Schools for Innovation & Entrepreneurship; this was the sixth consecutive such ranking.

=== Faculty ===
The university's faculty has included four Nobel Prize laureates. The earliest recipient, in 1956, was Juan Ramón Jiménez, a Spanish language and literature professor. Four decades later, physics professor William Daniel Phillips won a prize in physics for his contributions to laser cooling. In 2005, Thomas Schelling was awarded the prize in economics for his contributions to game theory. In 2006, John C. Mather was awarded the prize in physics alongside George Smoot for their work in the discovery of blackbody form and anisotropy of the cosmic microwave background radiation. In addition, two University of Maryland alumni are Nobel Prize laureates; Herbert Hauptman won the 1985 prize in chemistry, and Raymond Davis Jr. won the 2002 prize in physics.

The university has many notable academics. Professor of mathematics, Sergei Novikov won the Fields Medal in 1970, followed by alumnus Charles Fefferman in 1978. Alumnus George Dantzig won the 1975 National Medal of Science for his work in the field of linear programming. Professor of physics Michael Fisher won the Wolf Prize in 1980 (together with Kenneth G. Wilson and Leo Kadanoff) and the IUPAP Boltzmann Medal in 1983. James A. Yorke, a distinguished university professor of mathematics and physics and chair of the mathematics department, won the 2003 Japan Prize for his work in chaotic systems. In 2013, professor of physics Sylvester James Gates was awarded the National Medal of Science.

=== Research ===
UMD is classified among "R1: Doctoral Universities – Very high research activity". In FY 2020, the university spent about 1.103 billion dollars in total R&D expenditures, ranking it 16th in the nation. Furthermore, ranked 17th nationally in research R&D, UMD is one of only 57 public institutions in the Association of American Universities (AAU), reflecting its status as a top-tier research hub in the Baltimore–Washington metropolitan area.

On October 14, 2004, the university added 150 acres (61 ha) in an attempt to create the largest research park inside the Washington, D.C. Capital Beltway, formerly known as "M Square" and now known as the "Discovery District."

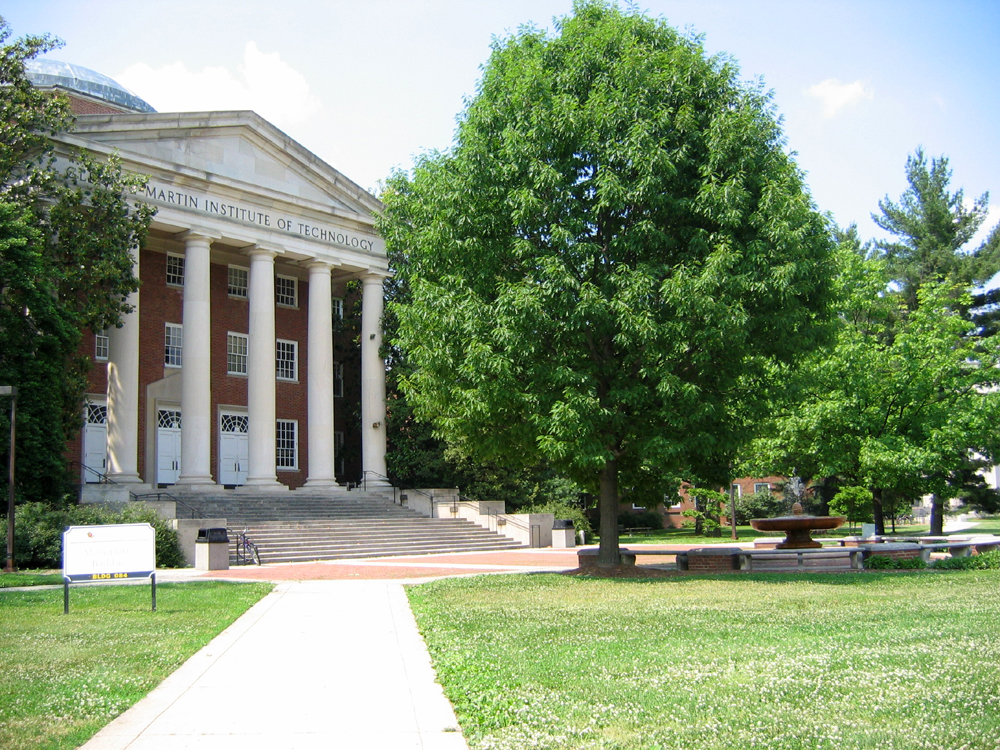
Glenn L. Martin Institute of Technology

Many of the faculty members have funding from federal agencies such as the National Science Foundation, the National Institutes of Health, NASA, the Department of Homeland Security, the National Institute of Standards and Technology, and the National Security Agency.

The Space Systems Laboratory researches human-robotic interaction for astronautics applications and includes the only neutral buoyancy facility at a university. The Joint Global Change Research Institute, which studies human and earth systems, was formed in 2001 by the University of Maryland and the Pacific Northwest National Laboratory.

The National Consortium for the Study of Terrorism and Responses to Terrorism (START) launched in 2005 as one of the Centers of Excellence supported by the Department of Homeland Security in the United States. START is focused on the scientific study of the causes and consequences of terrorism in the United States and worldwide.

=== Living-learning programs ===
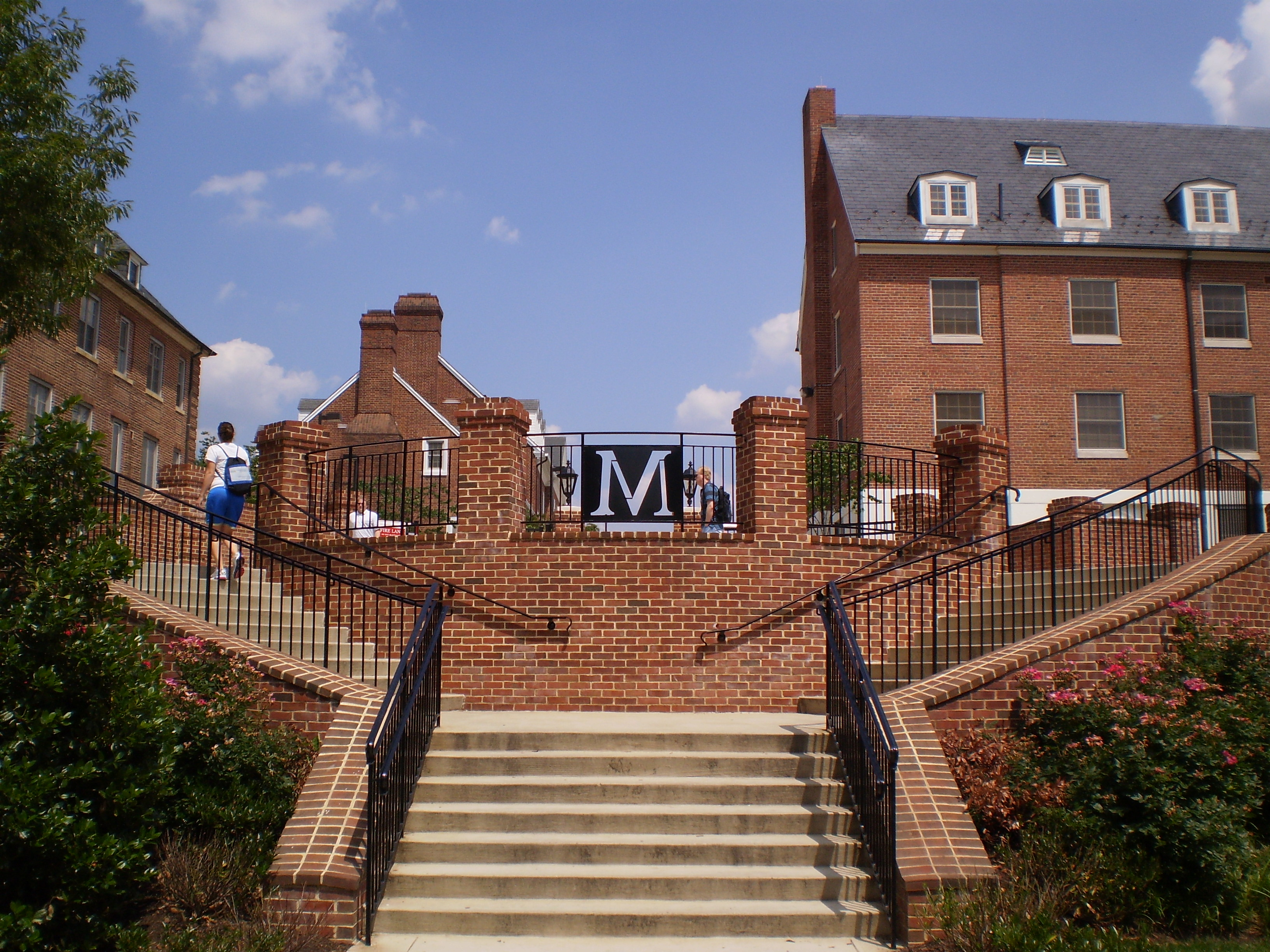
A stairway in South Campus

The university hosts "living-learning" programs (LLPs) that allow students with similar academic interests to live in the same residential community take specialized courses and perform research in those areas of expertise. These include CIVICUS, focused on politics and community service; Hinman CEOs, an entrepreneurship program; and the Language House, where students learning a shared target language live together. Several LLPs exist under the university's Honors College, with focuses in topics including cybersecurity, entrepreneurship, and life sciences. College Park Scholars is another LLP umbrella that includes programs in the arts, public health, and legal thought, among others.

== Student life ==
Student body composition as of May 2, 2022
Race and ethnicity	Total
Race and ethnicity	Total
White	40%
Asian	24%
Black	13%
Hispanic	11%
Two or more races	5%
Unknown	4%
International student	3%
Economic diversity
Low-income (Note: The percentage of students who received an income-based federal Pell grant intended for low-income students.)	19%
Affluent (Note: The percentage of students who are a part of the American middle class at the bare minimum.)	81%

=== Residential life ===
There are two main residential areas on campus, North Campus and South Campus. North Campus is made up of Cambridge Community (which consists of five residence halls and houses the College Park Scholars program), Denton Community (which consists of three halls), Oakland Community (which consists of one hall), Ellicott Community (consisting of three halls), and the Courtyards, a garden-style apartment community in north campus consisting of seven buildings. Most residence halls on campus, and quite a handful of instructional buildings, are named after real towns and cities in the state of Maryland. The Heritage community, completed in 2024, features two residence halls and a dining hall (Johnson Whittle Hall, Pyon Chen Hall, and Yahentamitsi Dining Hall.) Most residence halls have AC, but some do not. These non-AC halls are Caroline, Carroll, Cecil, Chestertown, Ellicott, Hagerstown, Wicomico, and Worcester.

South Campus includes the North Hill Community, made up of nine Georgian-style halls and Prince Frederick Hall (which opened in 2014) immediately west of McKeldin Mall; South Hill Community, made up of fourteen small residence halls for upper-level students; Leonardtown Community, which offers apartment-style housing; and the South Campus Commons Community, which consists of seven apartment-style buildings (the seventh and most recent building being opened in January 2010).

=== Dining ===
There are three dining halls on campus. In addition, a food court in the Stamp Student Union provides many fast food dining options for the university community. The 251 North dining hall lies in the Denton Community on the northern part of campus. The second northern dining hall, Yahentamitsi, is the first building on campus named in honor of Indigenous people which is the newest dining hall and is located next to the freshman dorms such as Johnson Whittle and Pyon-Chen. The third dining hall, South Campus Dining Hall, can be found just south of McKeldin Library.

=== Transportation ===
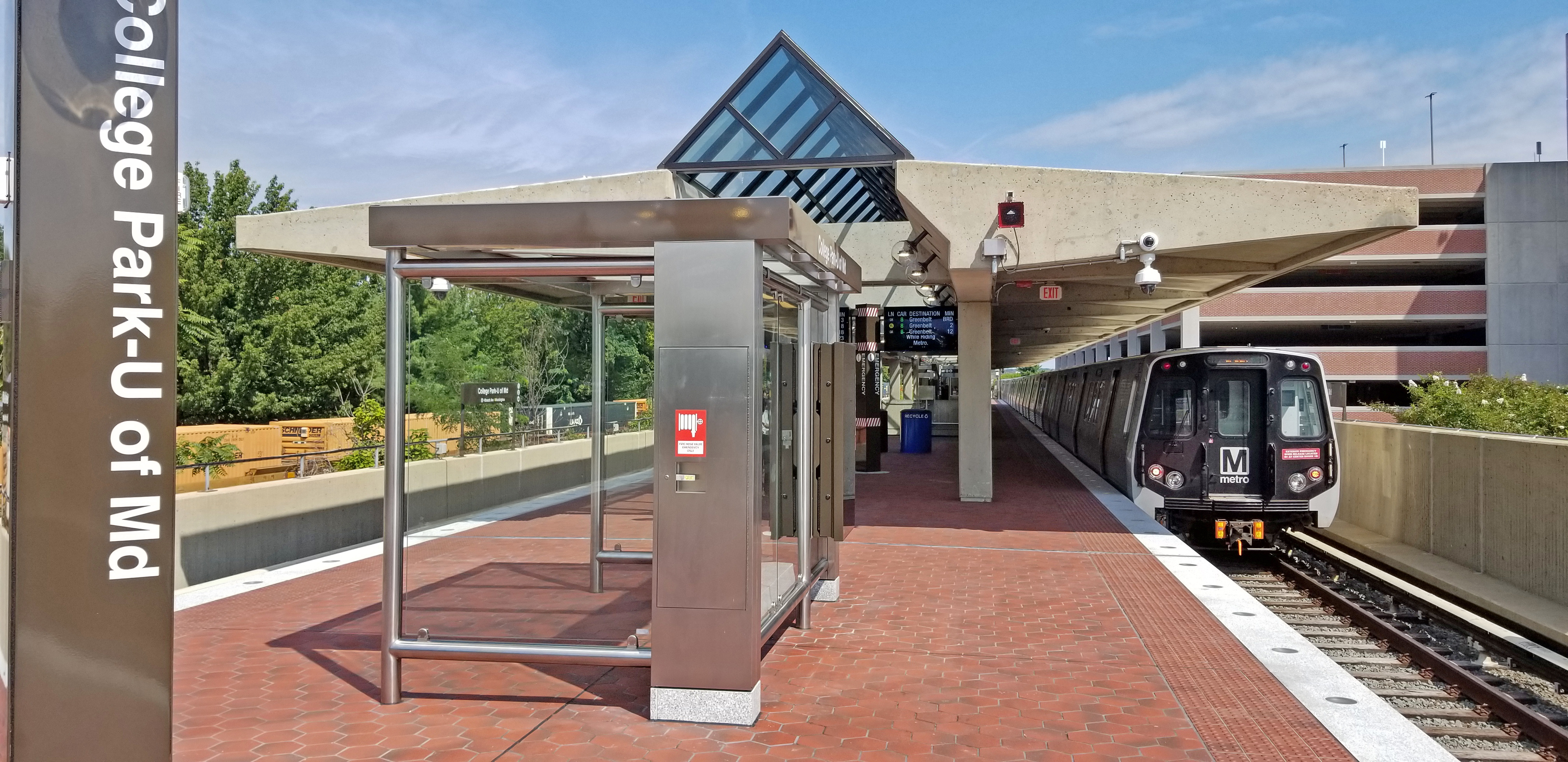
College Park-University of Maryland Metro station provides access to Downtown, Washington, D.C.

The university is accessible through the three airports in the greater Washington metropolitan area: Ronald Reagan Washington National Airport, Washington Dulles International Airport, and Baltimore/Washington International Thurgood Marshall Airport. A small public airport in College Park, College Park Airport, lies nearly adjacent to campus, but operations are limited. This airport is the world's oldest continually operating airport and the site of many significant aviation firsts.

A free shuttle service, known as Shuttle–UM, is available for UMD students, faculty, staff, and some residents of College Park and Greenbelt. Shuttle–UM also operates a curb-to-curb paratransit service for students, faculty, and staff with temporary or permanent disabilities, as well as NITE Ride, an on-demand evening service. Both services are booked through Terp Ride, a mobile app launched by the university's Department of Transportation Services. Paratransit riders must be certified to use the service and are asked to request rides at least one week in advance, though requests can be made as late as one hour before a trip. The university is served by an off-campus stop on the Washington Metro's Green Line called College Park – University of Maryland. This stop is adjacent to a stop on the MARC Camden line, a commuter rail line which runs from Baltimore to Washington, D.C. The stop is also serviced by busses from Shuttle–UM, MTA, WMATA, and TheBus.

The campus is also planned to be served by the Purple Line, a light rail line under construction by the Maryland Transit Administration connecting College Park with other inner suburbs of Maryland as well as the Red and Orange Lines of the Washington Metro. The Purple Line route will have five stops on and around the university's campus: M Square, the College Park Metro station, the main entrance to the campus on Route 1, near Stamp Student Union on Campus Drive, and on the other edge of campus on Adelphi Road, along with a parallel bike path. In April 2026, Purple Line railcars began moving through campus on a pre-service testing basis.

=== The Diamondback ===
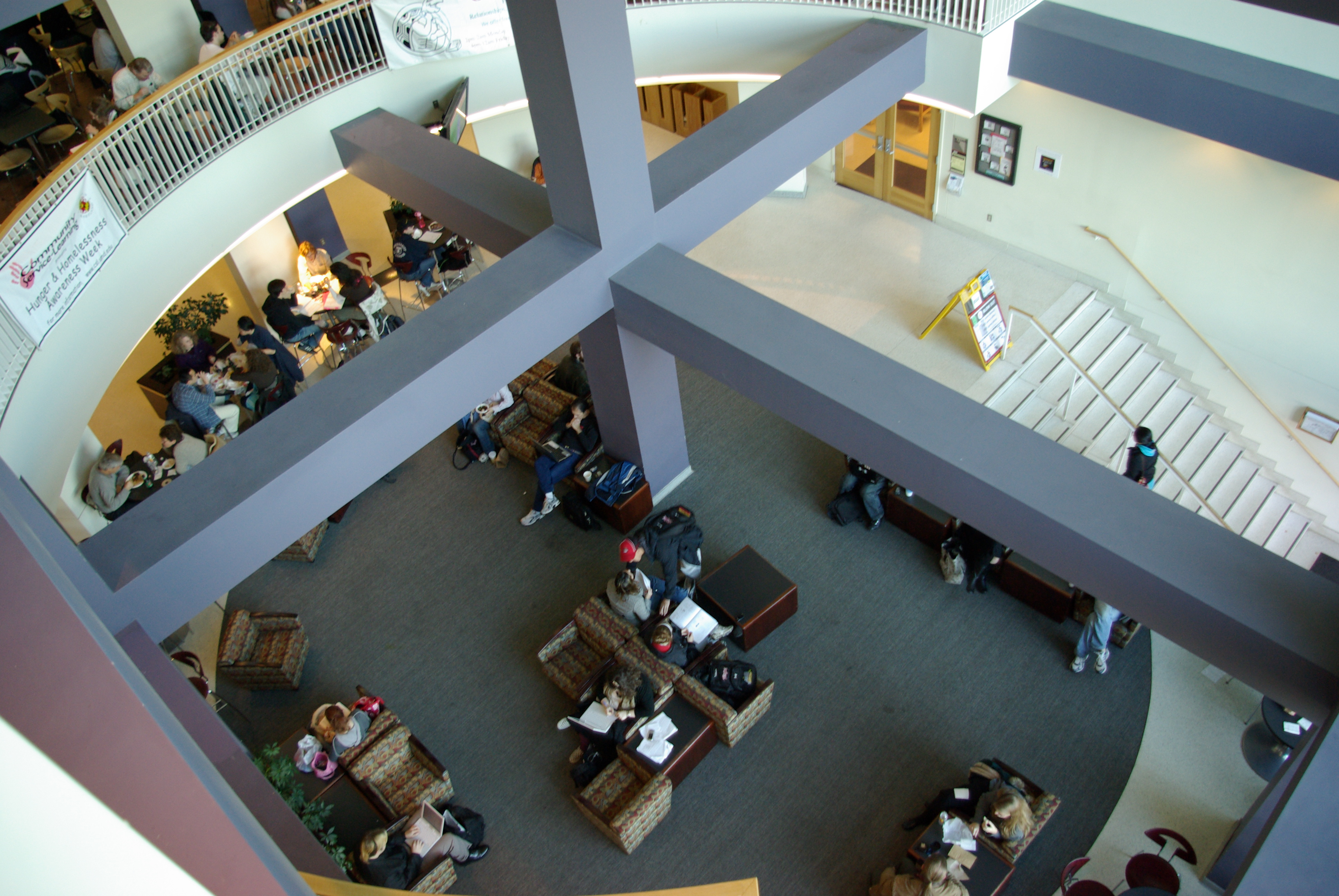
Atrium of Stamp Student Union, near the food court and co-op

The Diamondback is an independent student newspaper. It was founded in 1910 as The Triangle and renamed in 1921 in honor of a local reptile, the Diamondback terrapin, which became the school mascot in 1933. The newspaper is published online daily during the spring and fall semesters, with a circulation of 17,000 and annual advertising revenues of over $1 million. Notable journalists who have been with the paper include David Simon of HBO's The Wire and NBC's Homicide: Life on the Street, and cartoonists Jeff Kinney, who created the Diary of a Wimpy Kid fiction series and whose Igdoof strip appeared in The Diamondback; Aaron McGruder, who first published his cartoon The Boondocks in The Diamondback; and Frank Cho, who began his career with the popular University Squared for The Diamondback.

=== Other student activities ===
WMUC-FM (90.5 FM) is the university's non-commercial radio station, staffed by UMD students and volunteers. WMUC is a freeform and sports broadcasting station broadcast at 10 watts. Its broadcasts can be heard throughout the Washington metropolitan area. Notable WMUC alumni include Connie Chung, Bonnie Bernstein, Peter Rosenberg and Aaron McGruder.

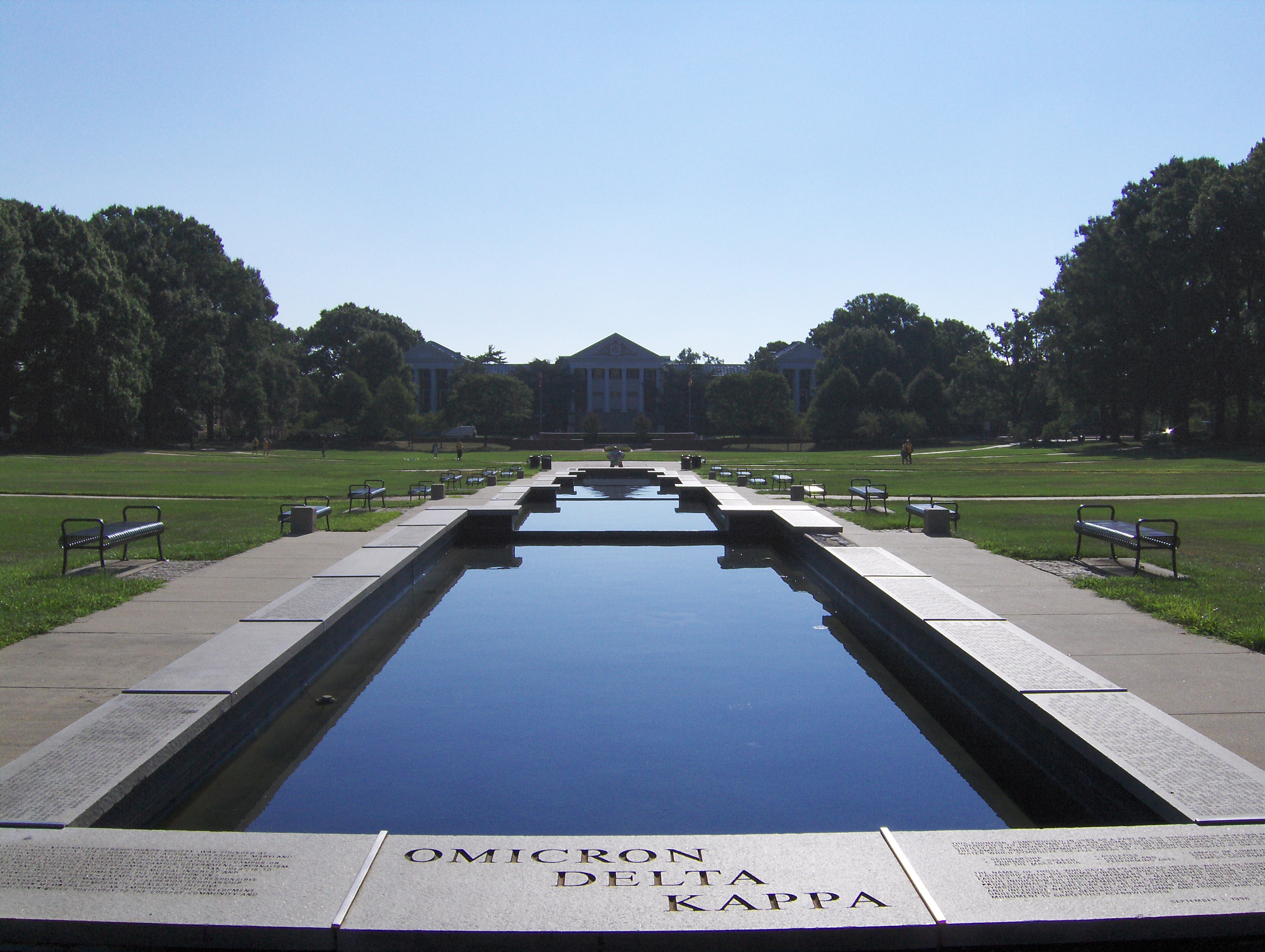
Thomas V. Miller, Jr. Administration Building, seen from the end of the reflecting pool

Approximately 16% of men and women in Maryland's undergraduate student body were involved in fraternities and sororities in 2017.

Maryland Day, an annual spring event that invites the public to campus for exhibits, performances, and interactive activities is hosted by the University.

== Athletics ==
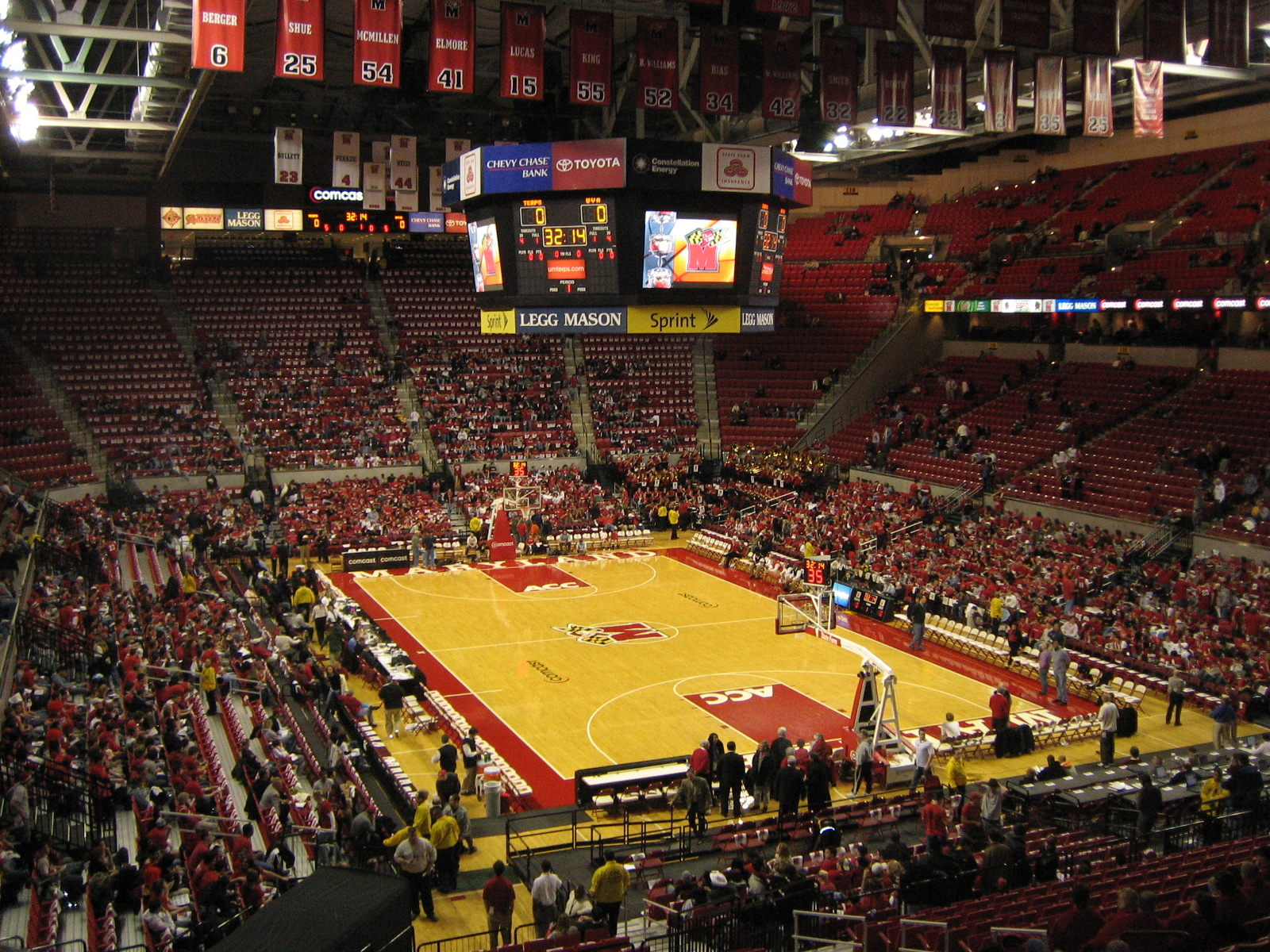
XFINITY Center, home of Maryland basketball

The university sponsors varsity athletic teams in 20 men's and women's sports. The teams, named the "Terrapins", represent Maryland in National Collegiate Athletic Association Division I competition. Maryland became a founding member of the Atlantic Coast Conference in 1952 but left to join the Big Ten Conference on July 1, 2014. As of 2025, Maryland's athletic teams have been awarded 47 national championships by the NCAA, USILA, AIAW, and NCA. In 2008 and 2010, The Princeton Review named the University of Maryland's athletic facilities the best in the nation. The Terrapins nickname (often shortened to "Terps") was coined by former university president, football coach, and athletic director H. C. "Curly" Byrd in 1932. The mascot is a diamondback terrapin named Testudo, which is Latin for "tortoise". Since the early 20th century, the school athletic colors have been some combination of those on the Maryland state flag: red, white, black, and gold. Maryland is the only NCAA Division I school to have four official school colors.

=== Basketball and football ===
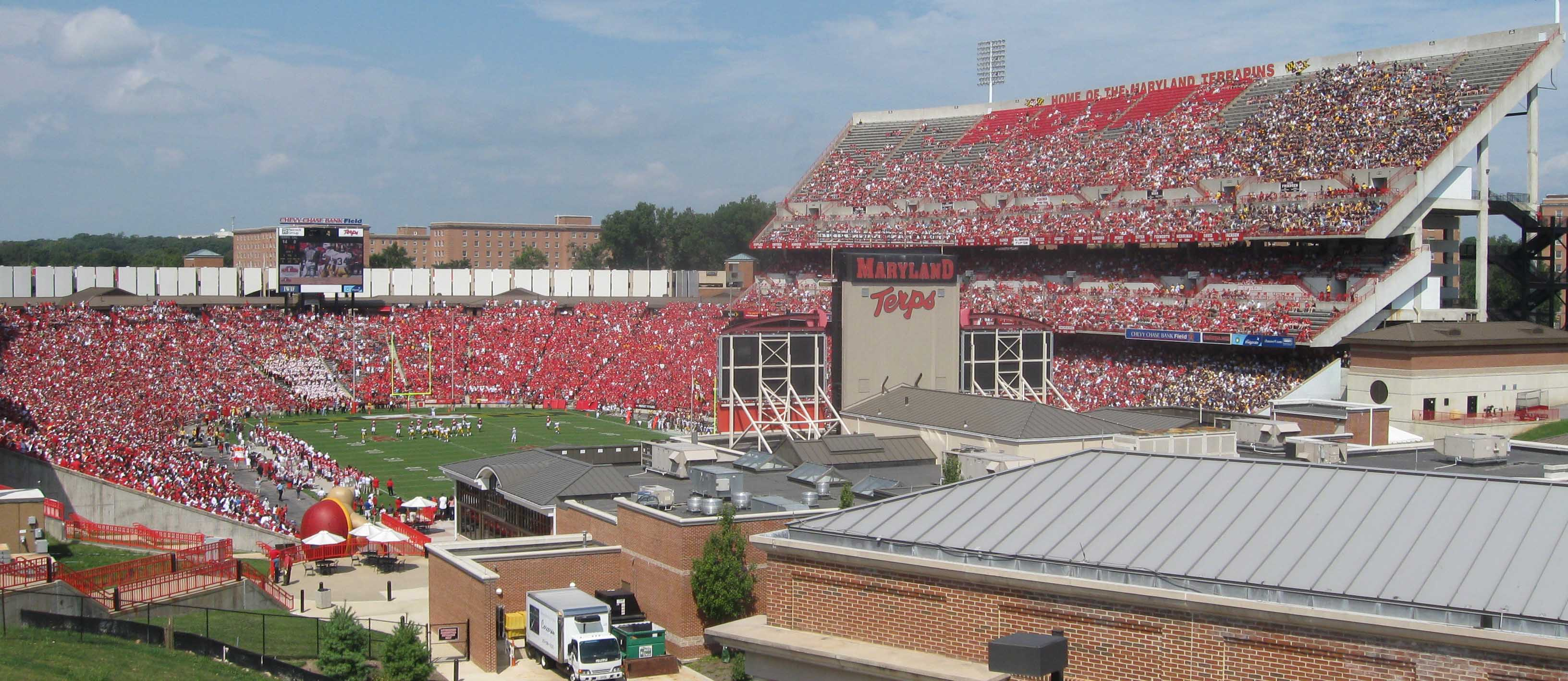
Maryland Stadium on game day

Men's basketball is the most popular sport at the university. Long-time head coach Lefty Driesell began the now nationwide tradition of "Midnight Madness" in 1971. Beginning in 1989, alumnus Gary Williams revived the program, which was struggling in the wake of Len Bias's death and NCAA rules infractions. Williams led Maryland basketball to national prominence with two Final Four appearances, and in 2002, a national championship. On February 7, 2006, Williams won his 349th game to surpass Driesell and became Maryland's all-time leader among basketball coaches.

Maryland football is also popular at the university.

=== Lacrosse ===
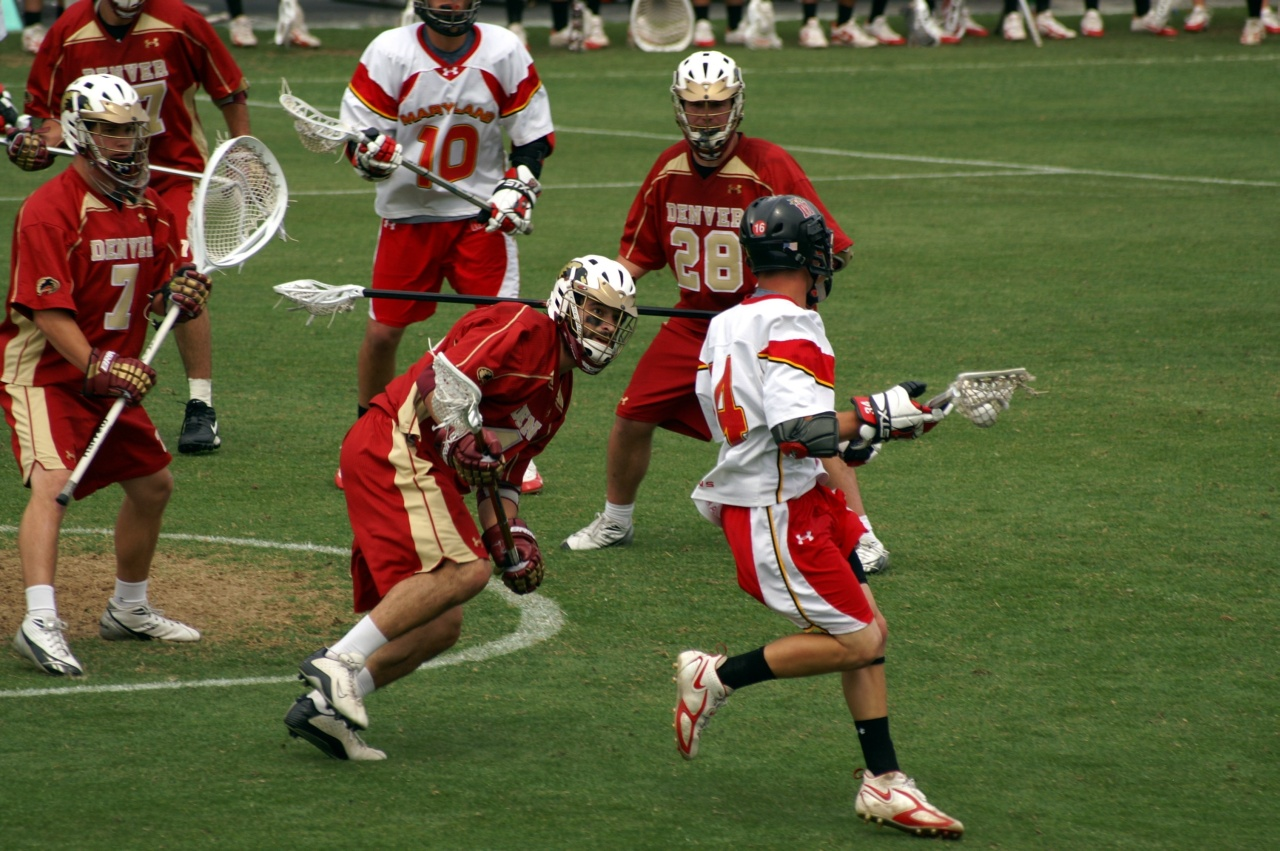
Maryland fields one of the nation's premier lacrosse programs.

Maryland men's lacrosse remains one of the sport's top programs since its beginnings as a squad in 1865. The team most recently won the national championship in 2022, completing an undefeated season, the first since Virginia in 2006, and the first to go undefeated across 18 games. The team has won ten USILA and NCAA national championships since its promotion to varsity status in 1924 and is a regular fixture in the NCAA tournament. The Maryland women's lacrosse team has won 15 national championships, the most of any program in the nation. The team has produced the National Player of the Year/Tewaaraton Award winner eight times, more than any other collegiate program. The Terrapins have also made the most NCAA tournament appearances, won the most tournament games, and made the most NCAA championship game appearances of any program. They most recently won the NCAA championship in 2019.

=== Soccer ===
The men's soccer team has won four NCAA Division I College Cup national championships, most recently in 2018. Under the guidance of head coach Sasho Cirovski, the soccer team has reached nine Final Fours and won three College Cups since 1997. The soccer team has developed a large, devoted fan base among students and the local community. The attendance record at Ludwig Field was set in 2015 when 8,449 fans saw Maryland win over top-ranked UCLA in extra time. The annual total attendance increased dramatically from 12,710 in 1995 to 35,631 in 2008.

=== Field hockey ===
The Maryland field hockey team has won a total of eight NCAA national championships and 13 conference championships (10 in the ACC and 5 in the Big Ten).

=== Marching band ===
The Mighty Sound of Maryland marching band attends all home football games and provides pre-game performances. During basketball season, the marching band provides music in the stands.

=== Club sports ===
University of Maryland also has 48 club sports teams, including rugby, fencing, ice hockey, boxing, soccer, swimming, club running (cross country/track and field), crew, ultimate frisbee, rugby, tennis, volleyball, badminton, bowling, cycling, water polo, club wrestling, tennis, and in martial arts such as Brazilian jiu-jitsu.

== Maryland Day ==
Maryland Day is an annual campus-wide family-oriented community outreach event and open house. It features demonstrations, performances, sports events, tours, hands-on activities, food, games, give-aways, and information about research, academics, student life, and other activities at the university and in the surrounding community.

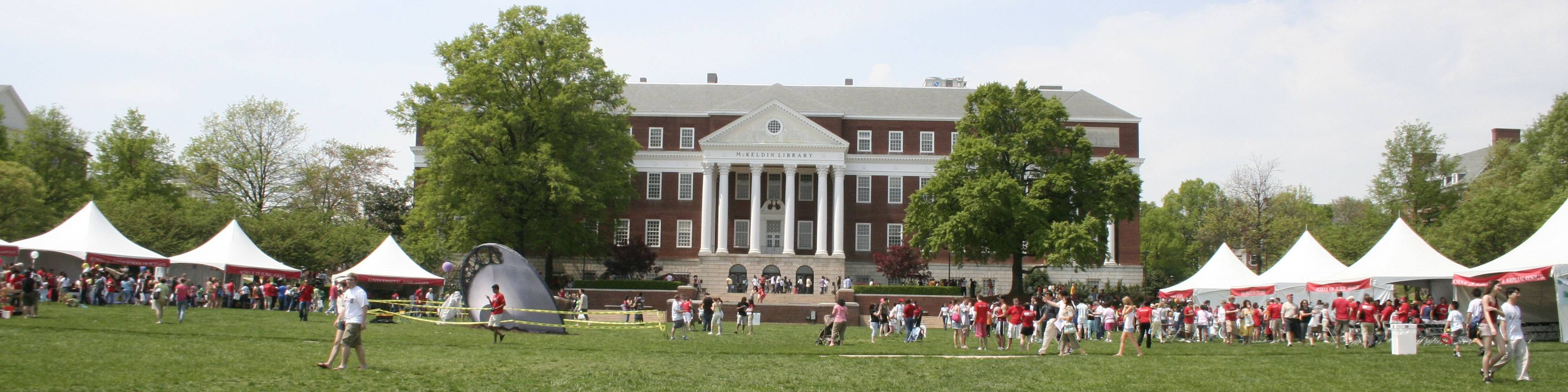
Visitors and pavilions in front of McKeldin Library on Maryland Day, 2008

The event generally runs from 10am to 4pm on the last Saturday in April, and admission is free. The university estimates that 8,000 volunteers participate, and has claimed an annual attendance of at least 80,000. In 2023, there were over 300 attractions at Maryland Day.

=== History ===
Maryland Day was proposed in 1998 by then-president of the University, Dan Mote, and was first held in 1999, with the inaugural theme "Explore our World". Maryland Day incorporated the Ag Day event held by the College of Agriculture and Natural Resources since 1925, which includes livestock shows and showmanship competitions. The Maryland Terrapins football Spring Game, an annual scrimmage tradition since 1951, has been held on Maryland Day since 2001.

For the tenth anniversary event in 2008, campus dining services presented what it claimed to be the world's largest batch of cupcakes, a 60-by-45-foot (18 by 14 m) display of 50,000 cupcakes depicting the University's seal.

The event was cancelled in 2020 and 2021 due to the COVID-19 pandemic.

In 2022, students led a march for LGBTQ rights during Maryland Day activities, in response to anti-LGBTQ legislation being promoted in several US states.

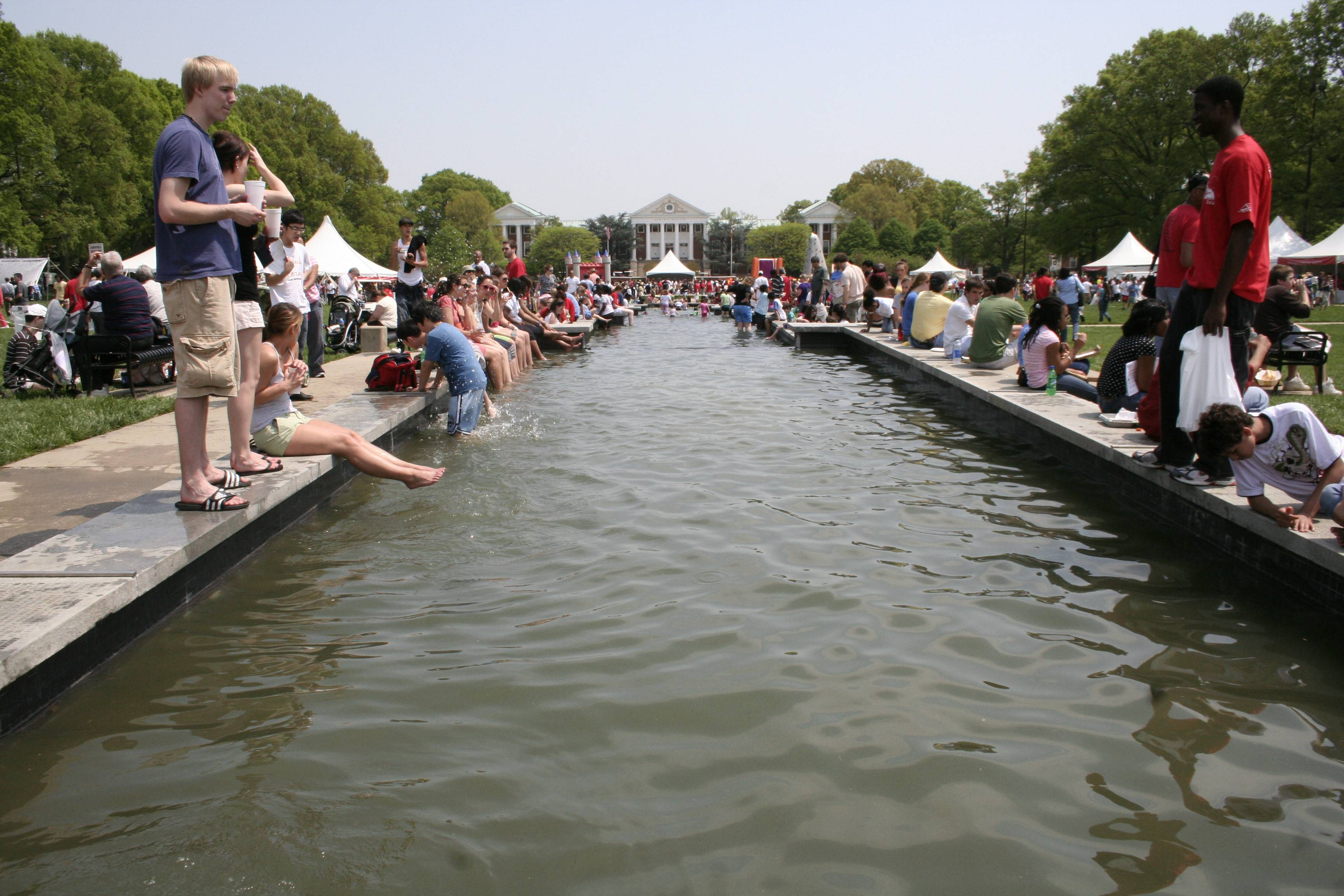
Visitors at the fountain on McKeldin Mall, 2008

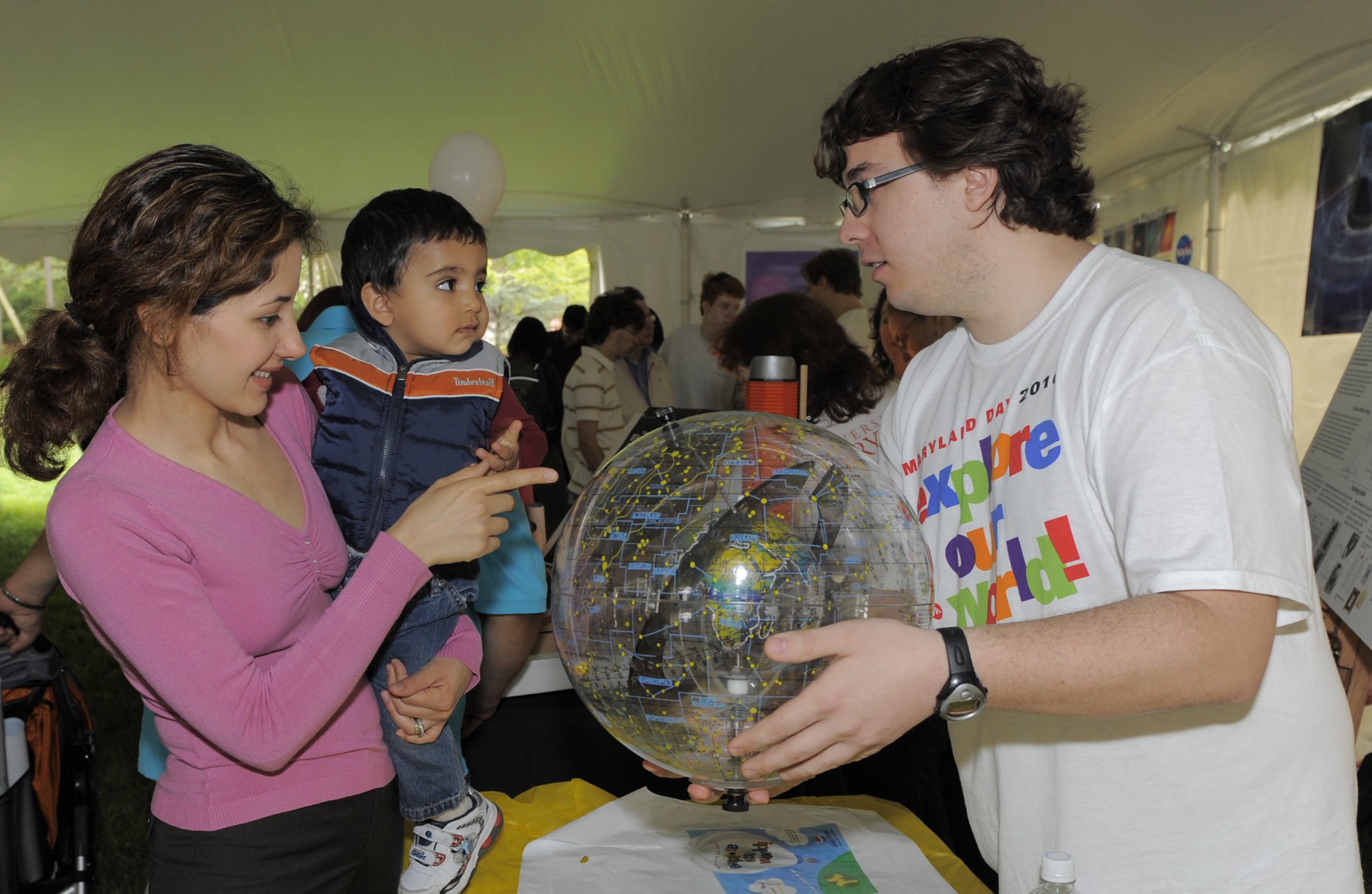
A volunteer displays a celestial globe for a young visitor, 2010

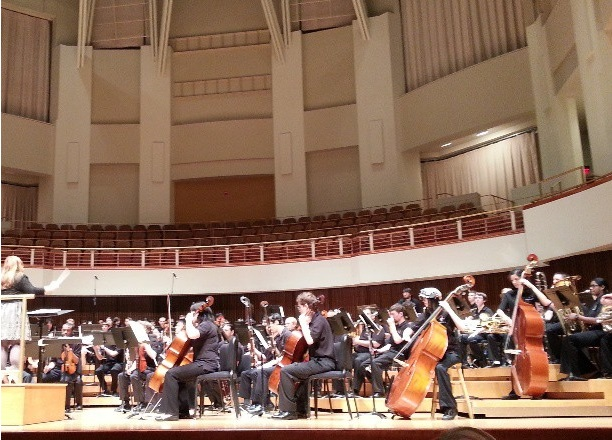
Gamer Symphony Orchestra performing at the Clarice Smith Performing Arts Center, 2013

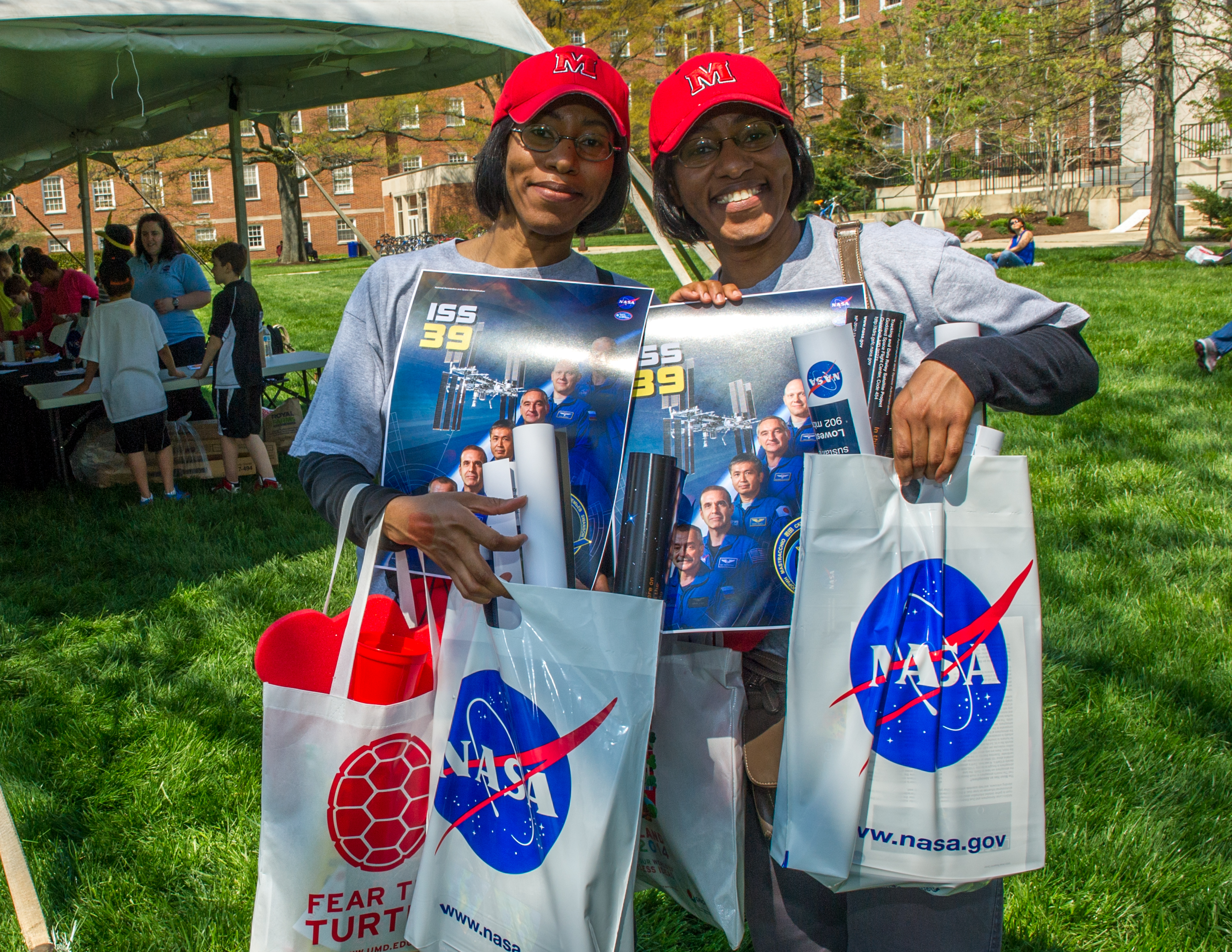
Visitors to Maryland Day displaying NASA Goddard swag, 2014

== Notable alumni ==
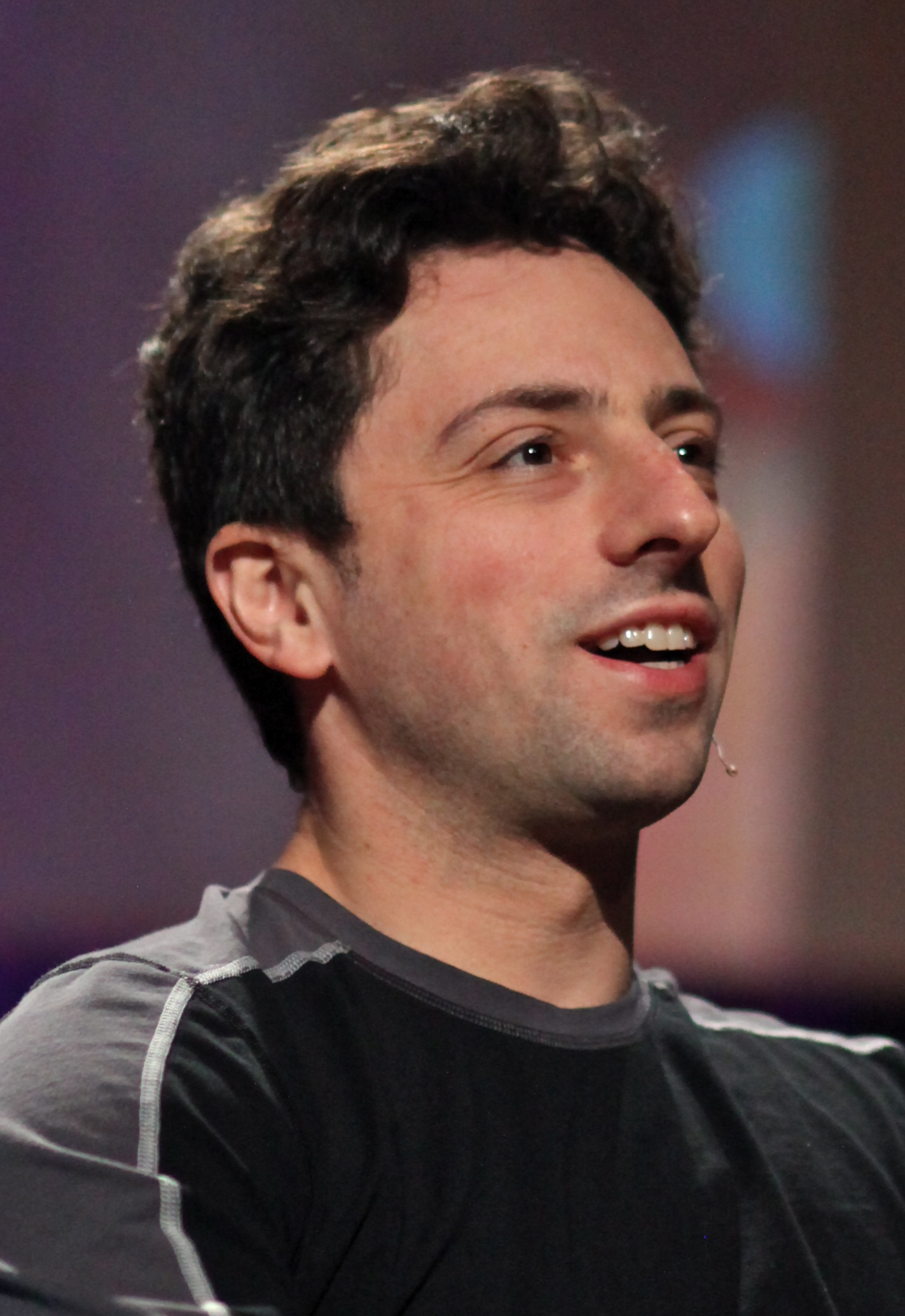
Sergey Brin, co-founder of Google

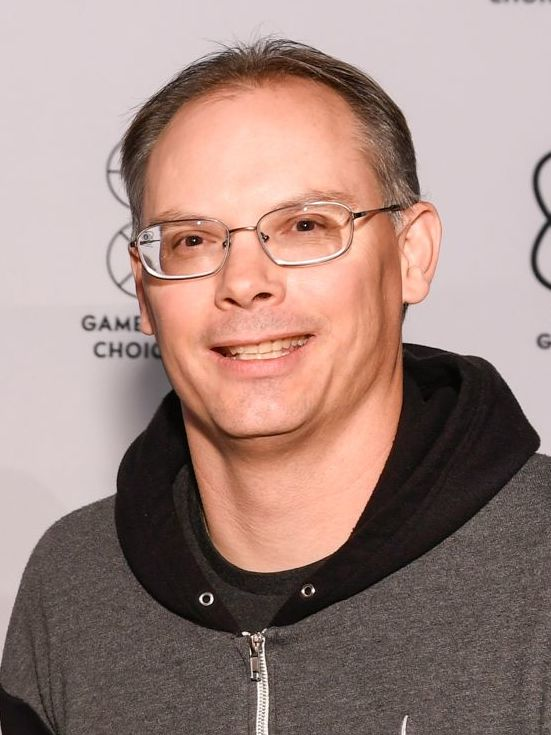
Tim Sweeney, CEO of Epic Games and creator of Fortnite

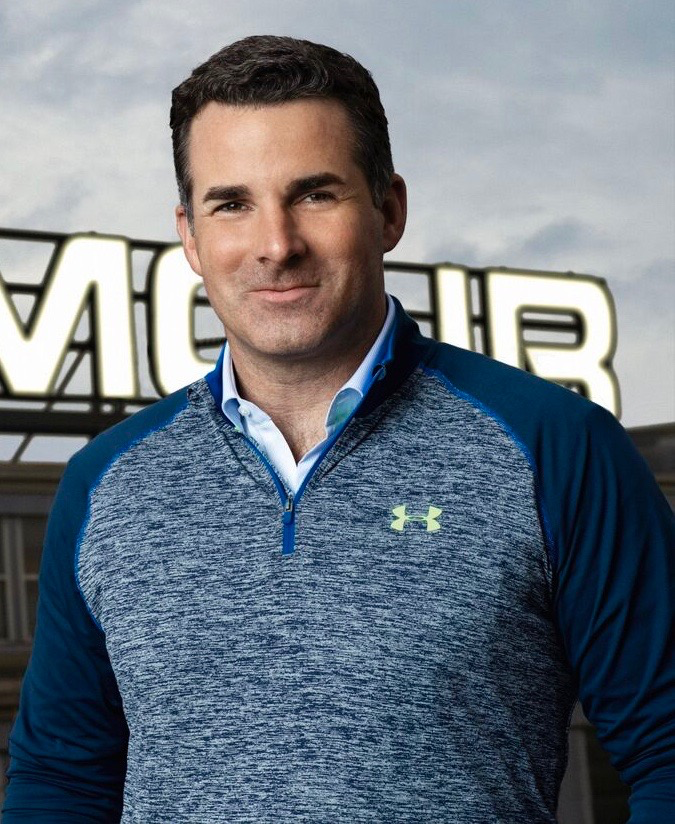
Kevin Plank, founder and CEO of Under Armour

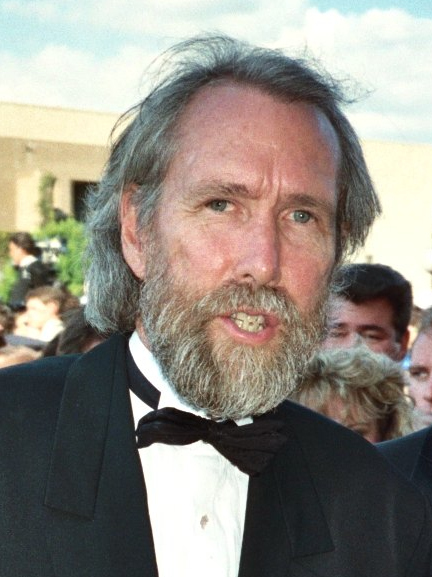
Jim Henson, creator of The Muppets

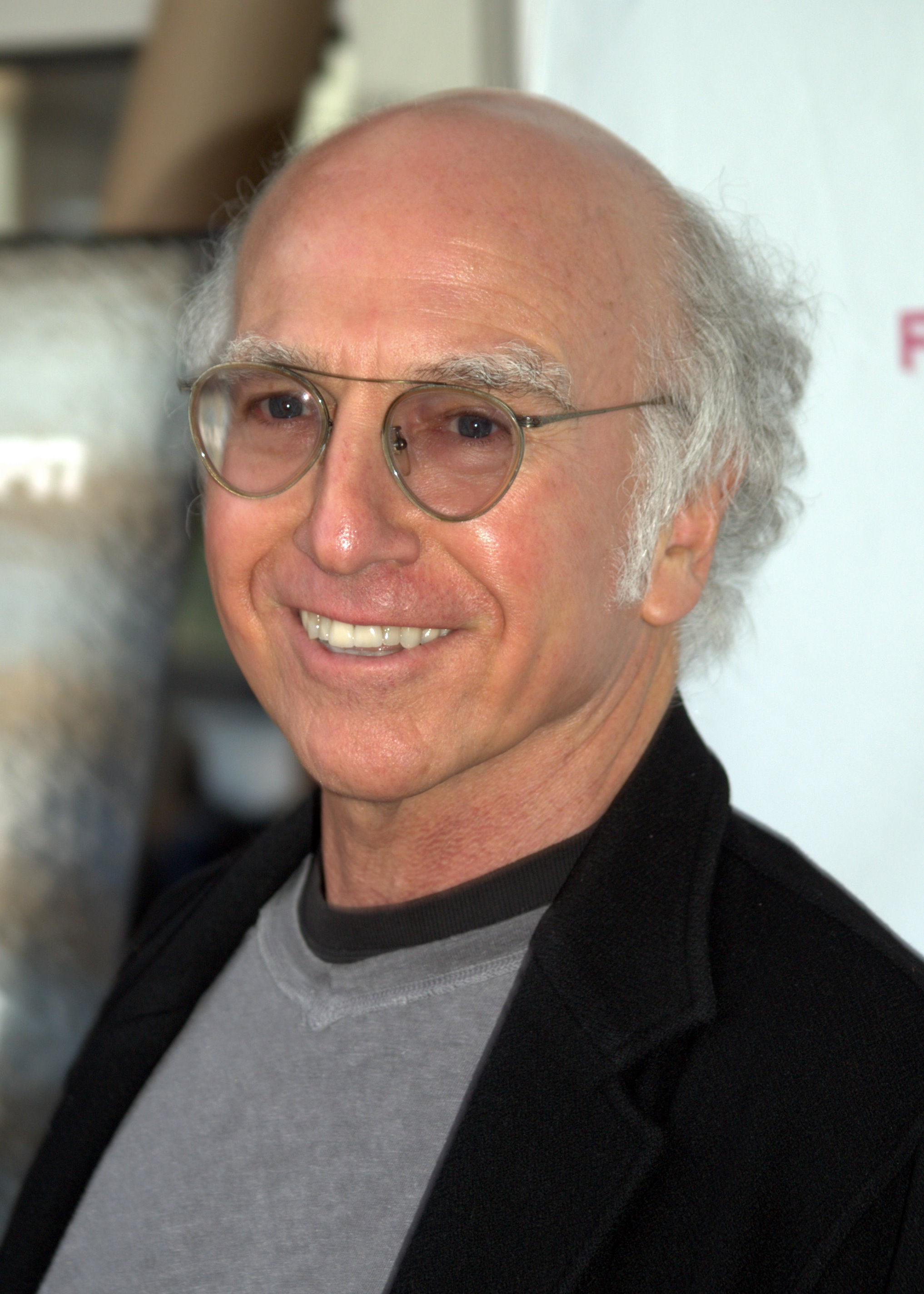
Larry David, co-creator of Seinfeld and creator of Curb Your Enthusiasm

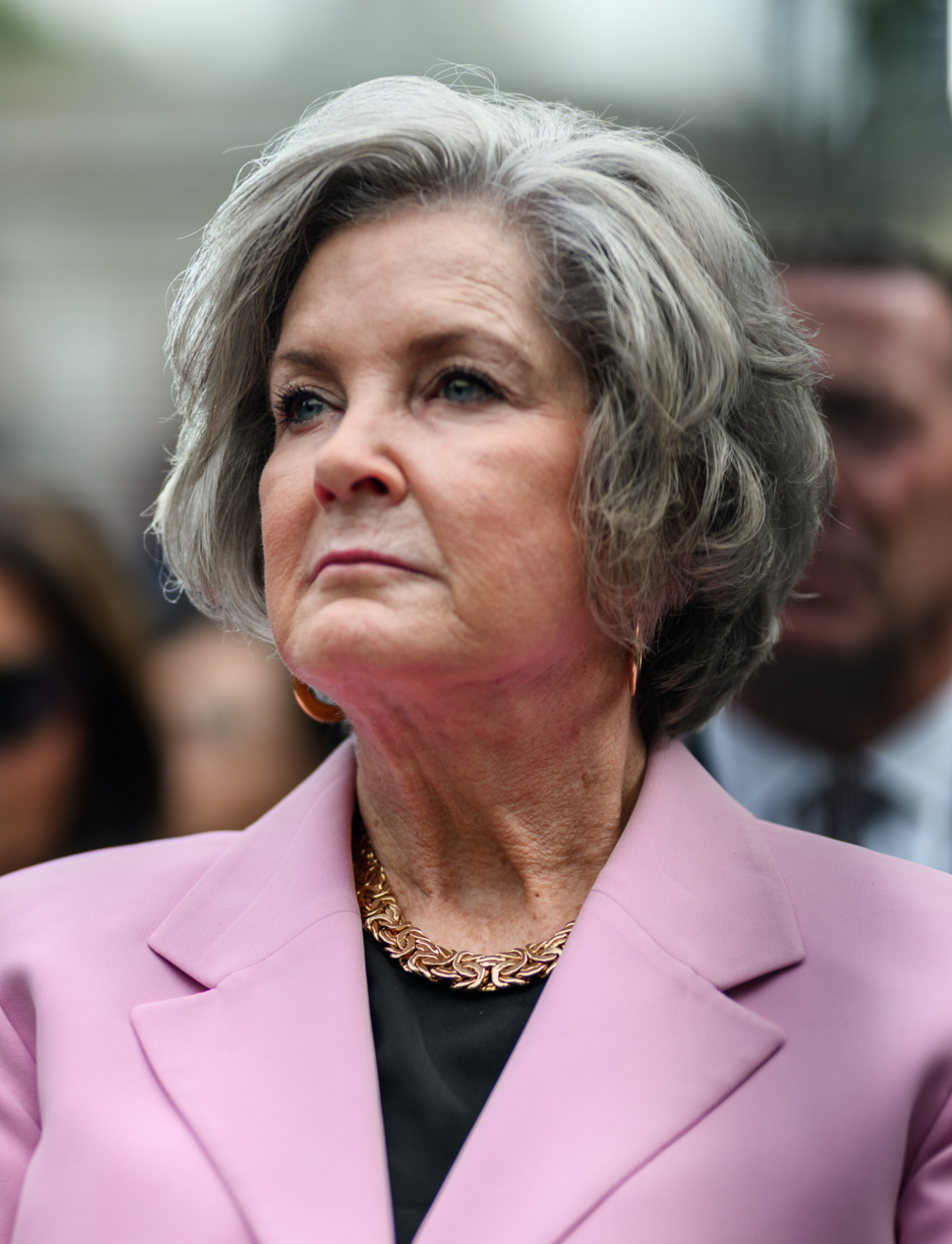
Susie Wiles, current White House Chief of Staff

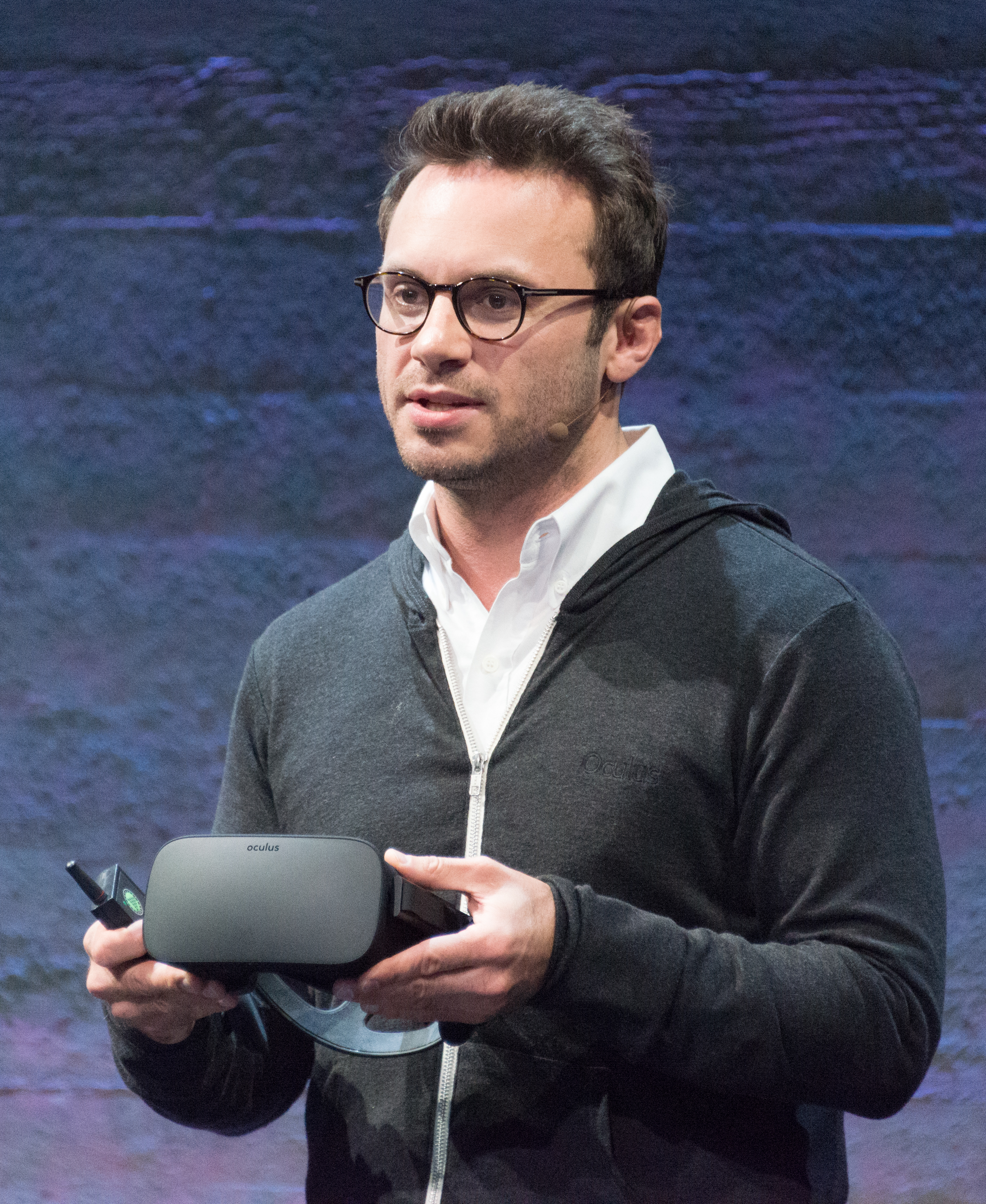
Brendan Iribe, co-founder of Oculus VR

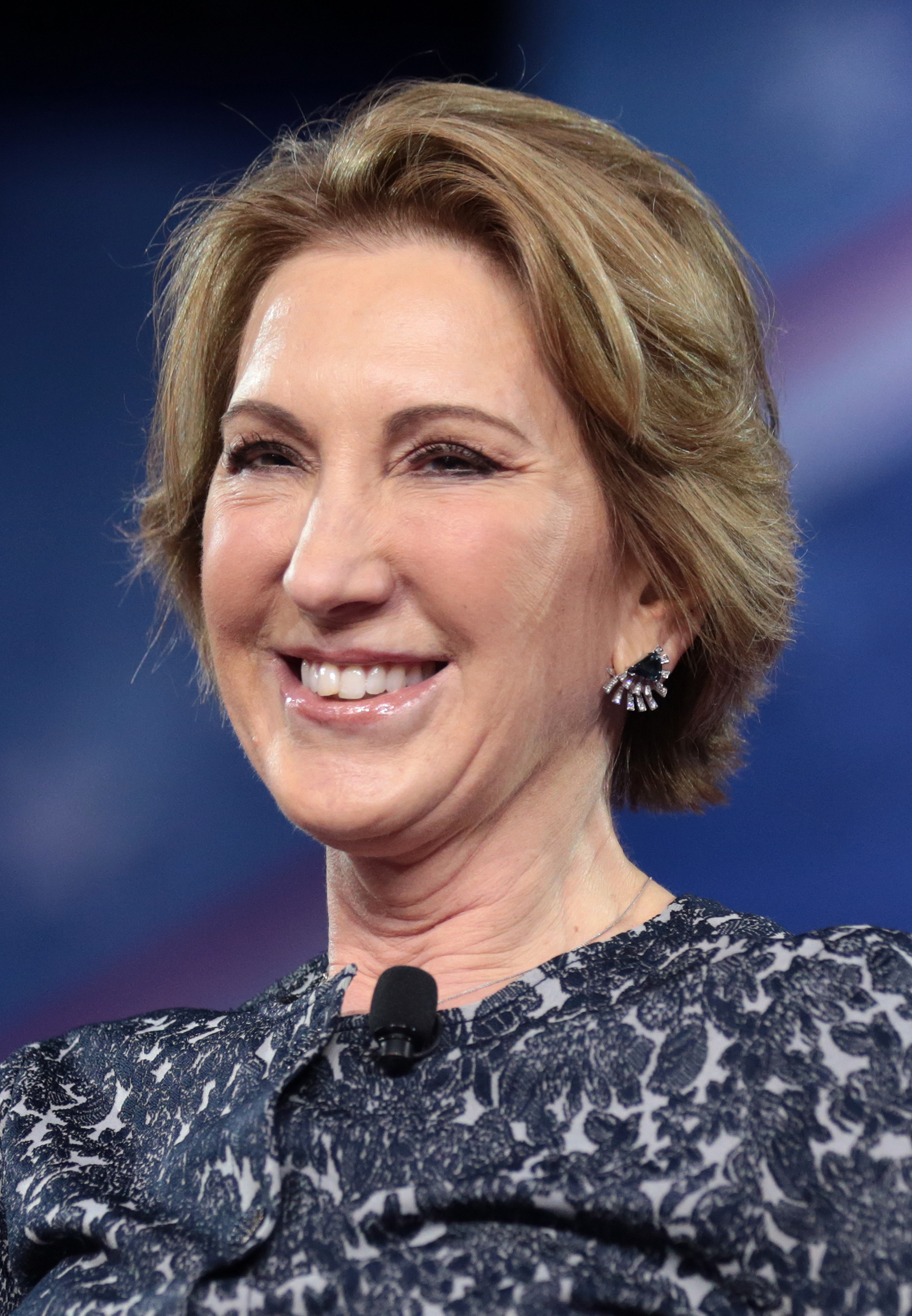
Carly Fiorina, former CEO of Hewlett-Packard

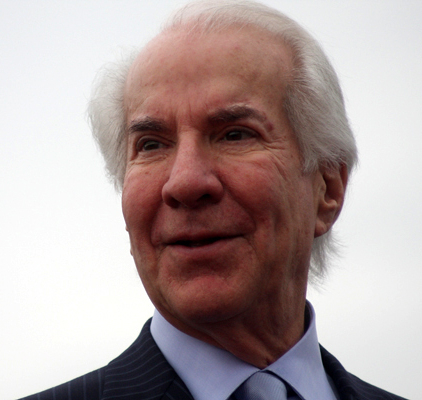
Ed Snider, former owner of the Philadelphia Flyers and Philadelphia 76ers

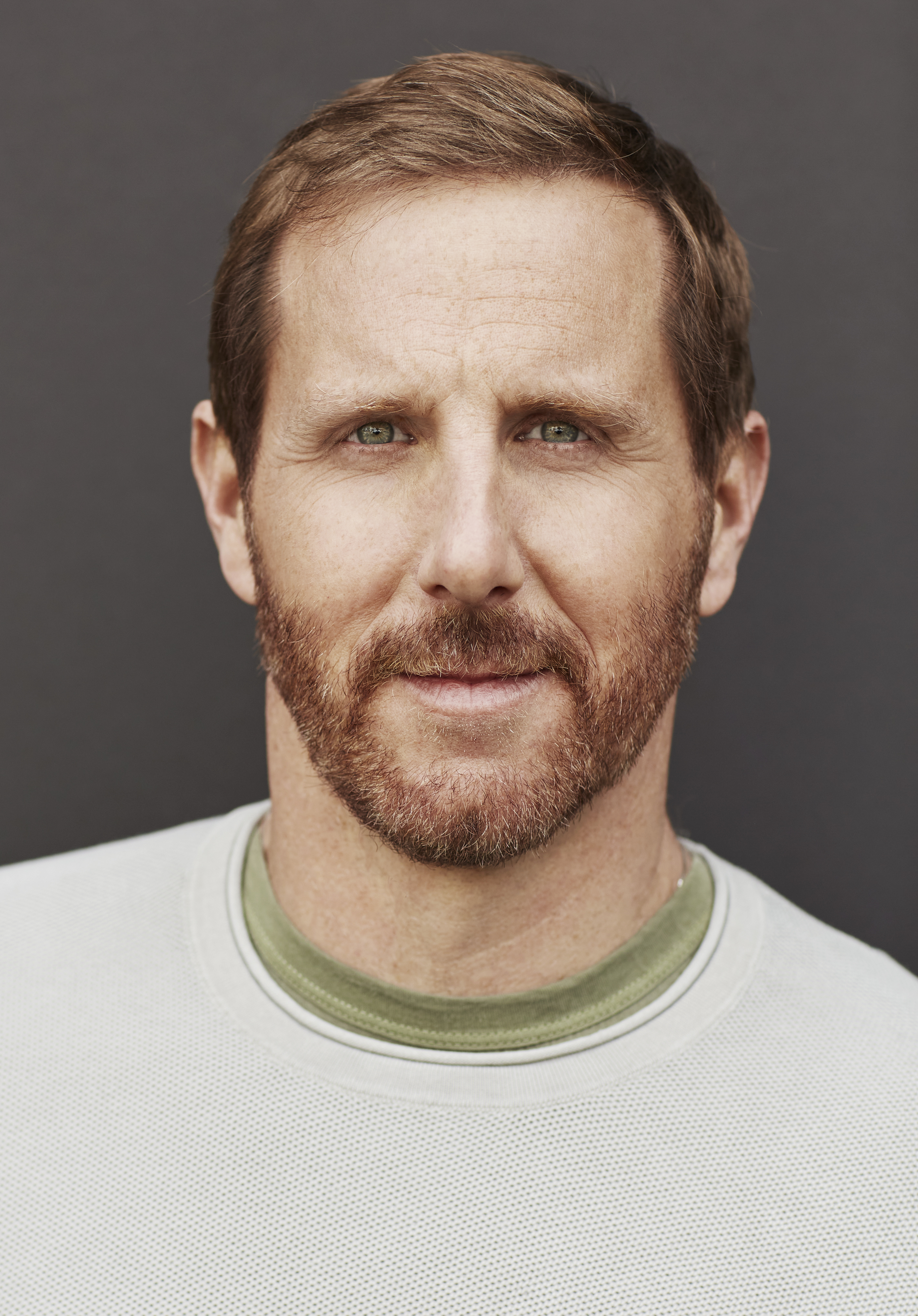
Ethan Brown, founder of Beyond Meat

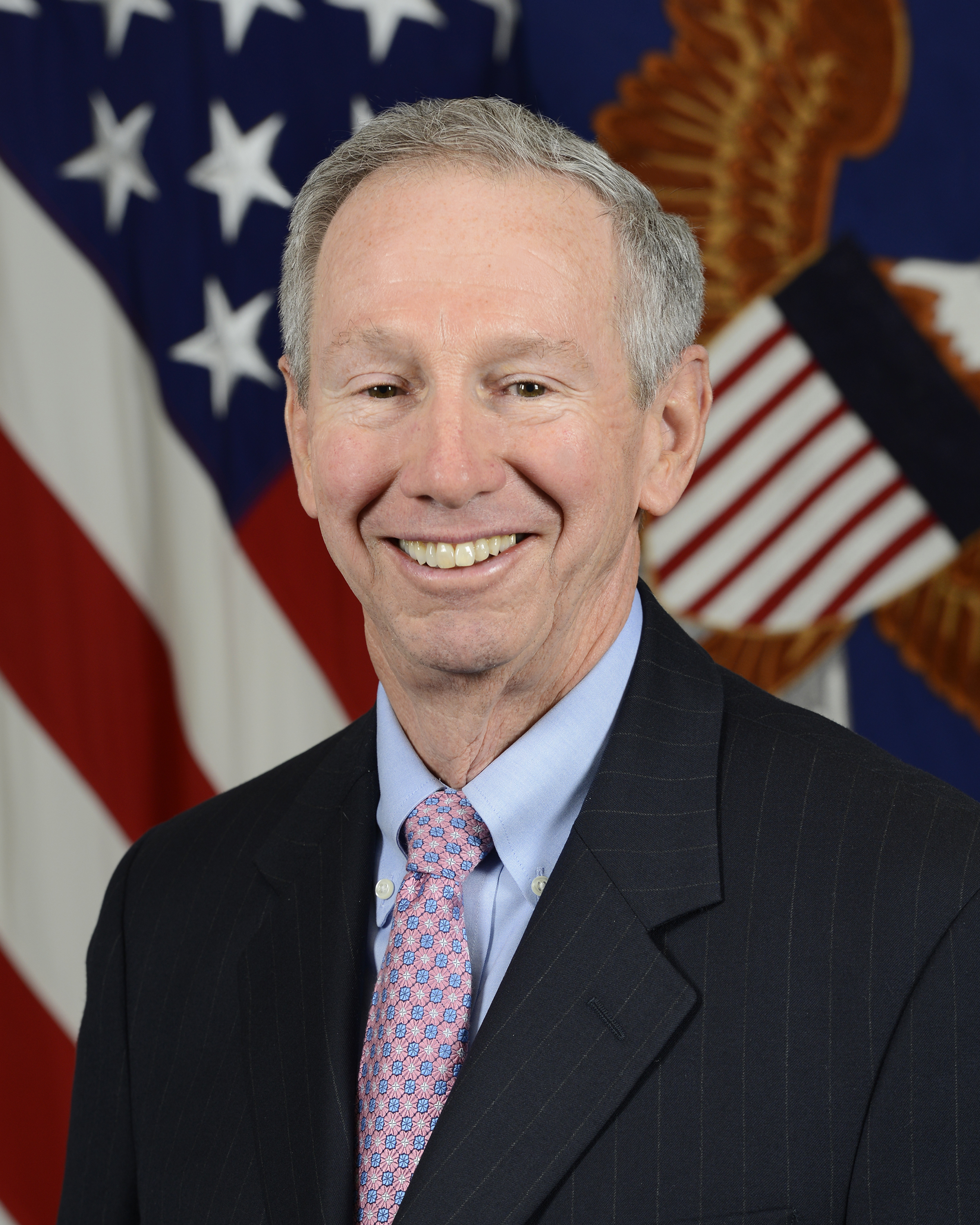
Michael D. Griffin, 11th Administrator of NASA

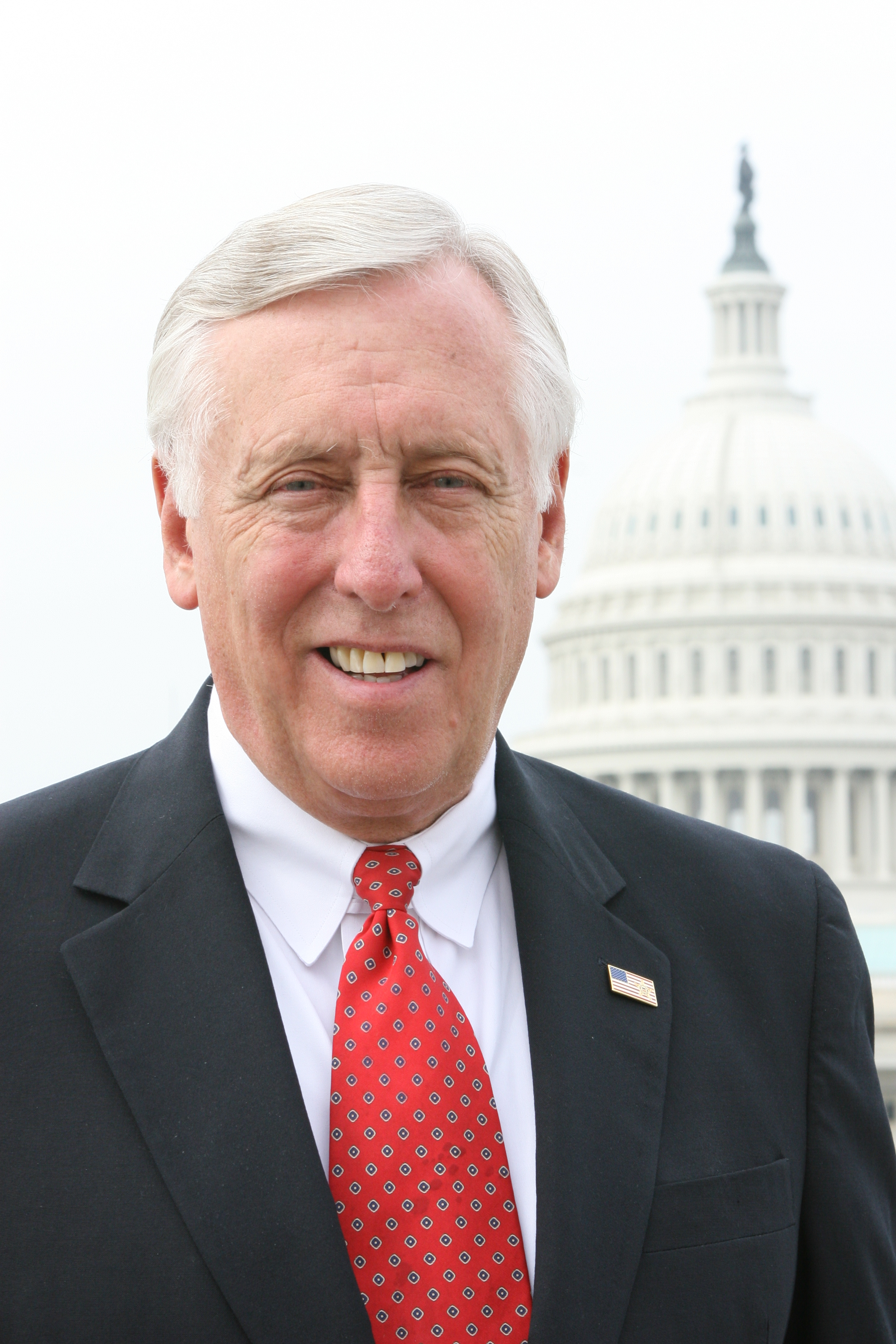
Steny Hoyer, Former House Majority Leader and U.S. Representative

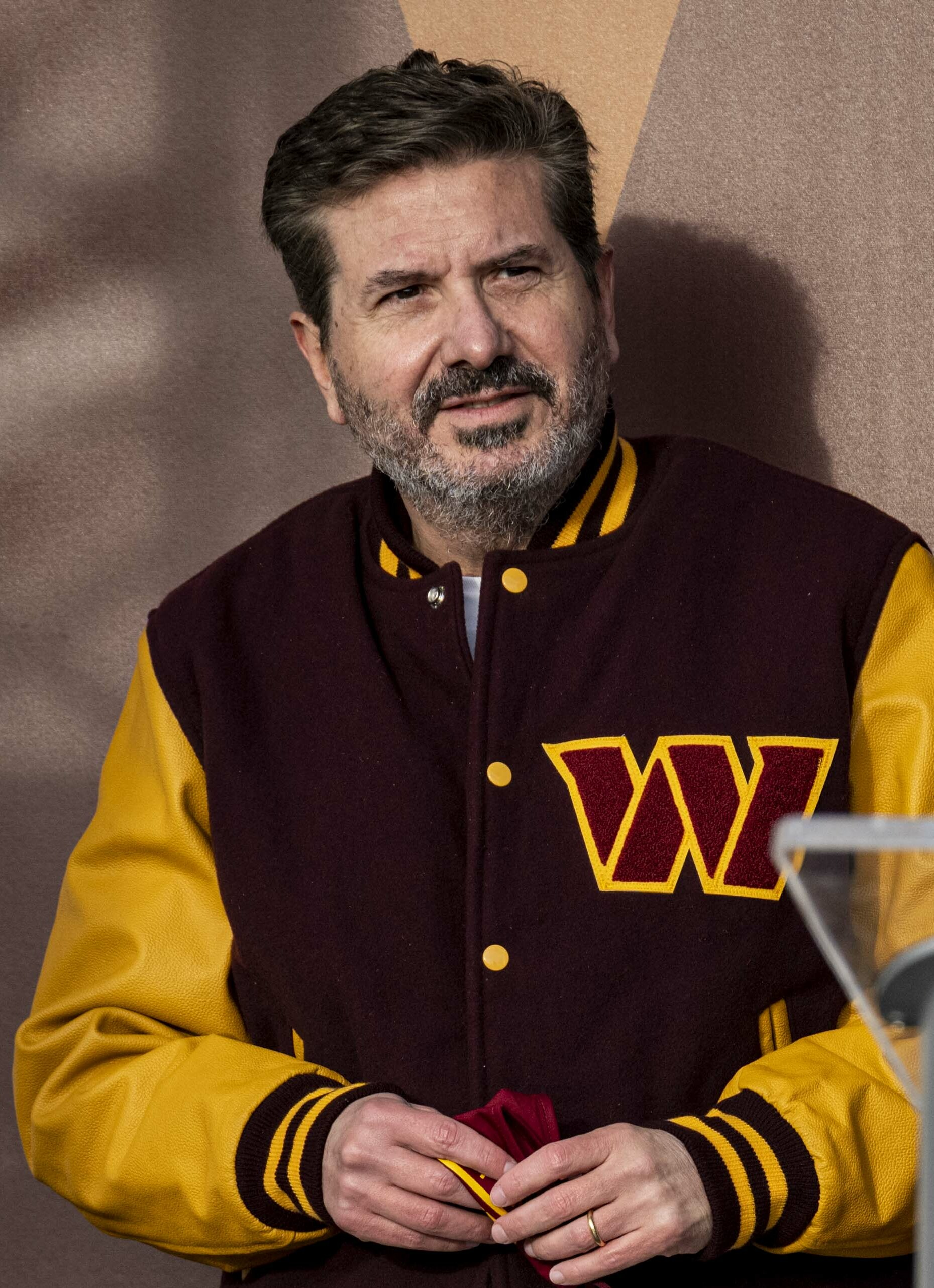
Daniel Snyder, former owner of the Washington Commanders

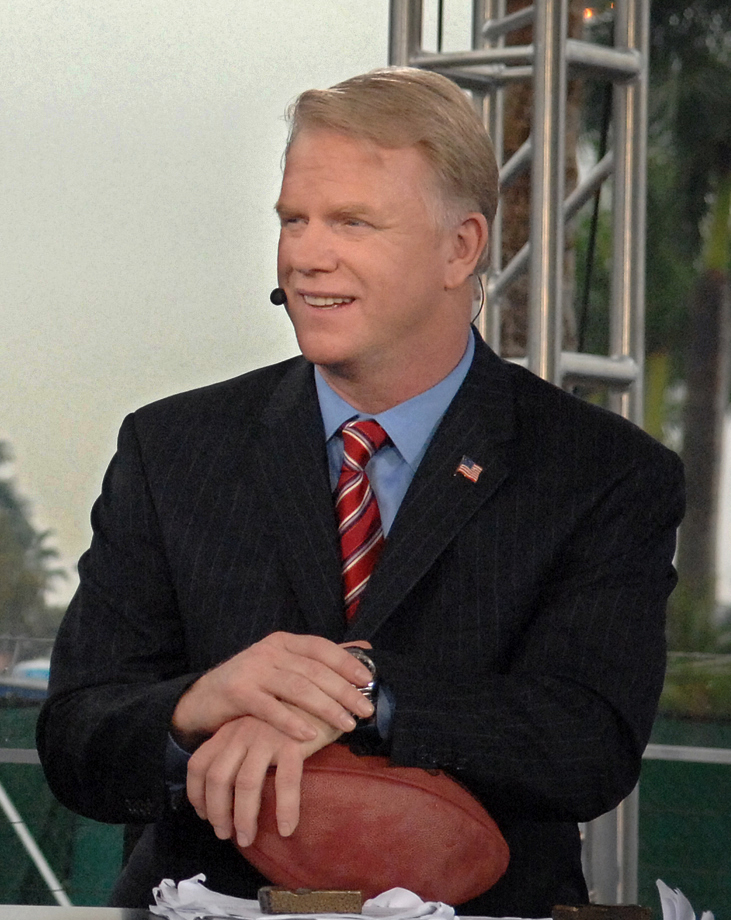
Boomer Esiason, former NFL MVP quarterback

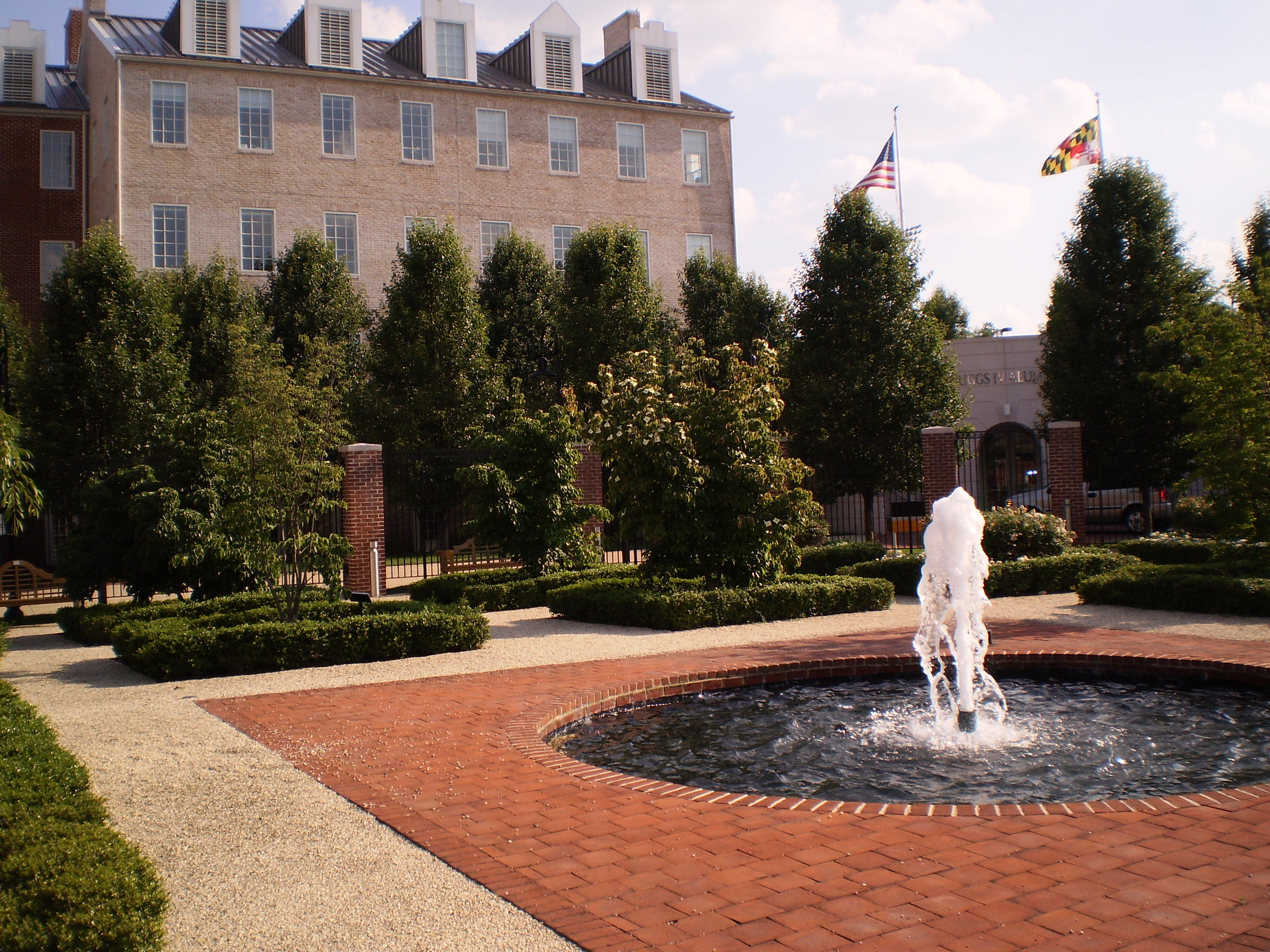
Kappa Kappa Gamma Memorial Fountain in front of the Riggs Alumni Center

Notable alumni include House Democratic Whip Steny Hoyer; Google co-founder Sergey Brin; The Muppets creator Jim Henson; The Wire creator David Simon; former NFL Quarterback Norman "Boomer" Esiason; CBS host Gayle King; journalist Connie Chung; and Seinfeld co-creator and Curb Your Enthusiasm creator Larry David. Prominent alumni in business include Ed Snider, former chairman of Comcast Spectacor and former owner of the Philadelphia Flyers and Reena Aggarwal, Robert E. McDonough Professor of Finance at Georgetown University and Director of the Psaros Center for Financial Markets and Policy; journalist Jim Walton, former president and CEO of CNN; Kevin Plank, founder and executive chairman of the athletic apparel company Under Armour; Chris Kubasik, former president of Lockheed Martin; and Carly Fiorina, former CEO of Hewlett-Packard. Journalist Carl Bernstein, who won the Pulitzer Prize for Public Service for his coverage of the Watergate scandal, attended the university but did not graduate.

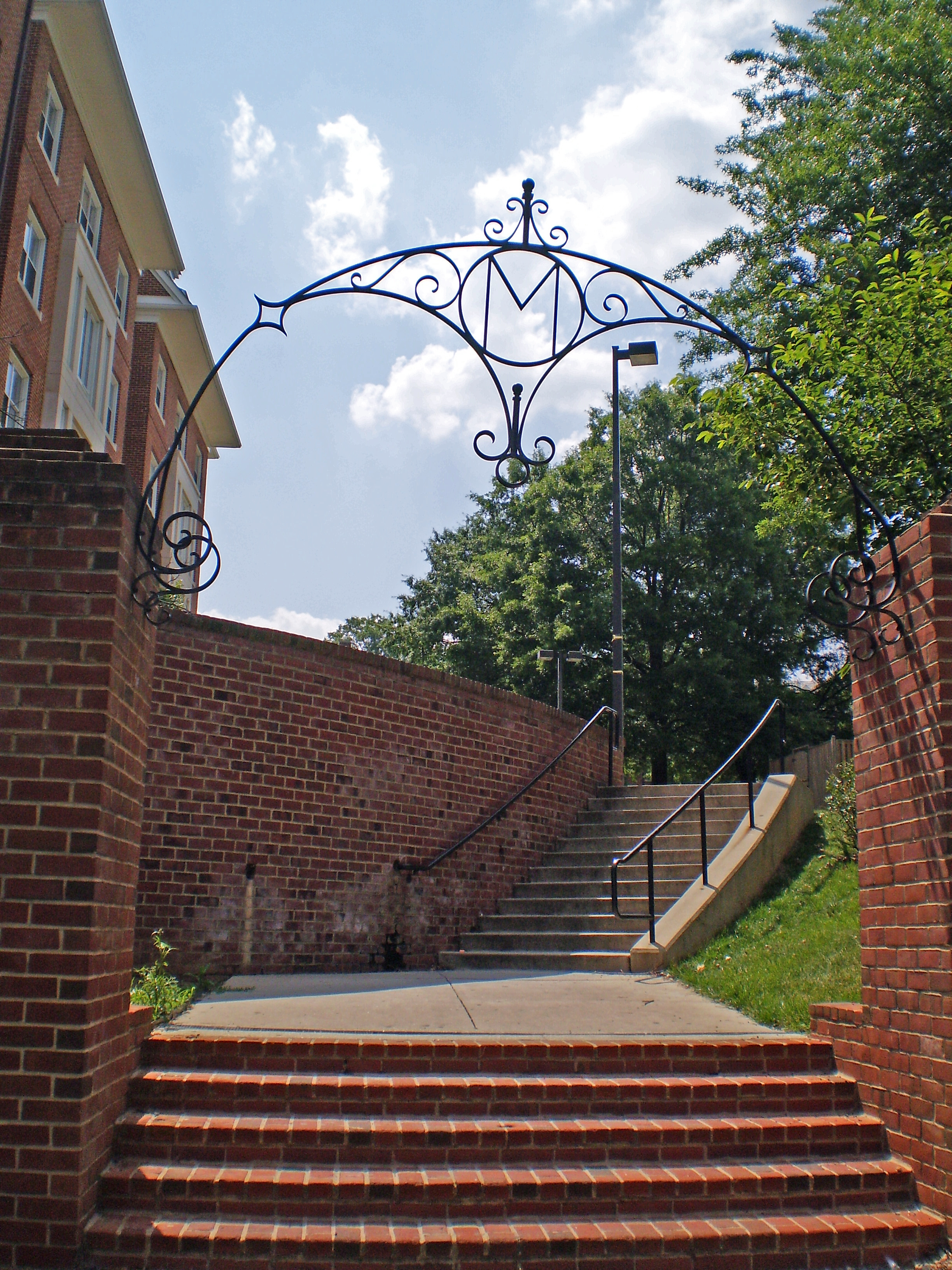
An arched gateway on campus, located between Montgomery Hall and South Campus Commons #3

Attendees within the fields of science and mathematics are Nobel laureates Raymond Davis Jr., 2002 winner in Physics; Herbert Hauptman, 1985 winner in Chemistry, and Fields Medal winner Charles Fefferman. Other alumni include George Dantzig, considered the father of linear programming; late NASA astronaut Judith Resnik, who died in the destruction of the Space Shuttle Challenger during the launch of mission STS-51-L; and NASA Administrator Michael D. Griffin.

Several donors have distinguished themselves for their sizable gifts to the university. Businessman Robert H. Smith, who graduated from the university in 1950 with a degree in accounting, gave over $45 million to the business school that now bears his name and to the Clarice Smith Performing Arts Center, which bears his wife's name. Construction entrepreneur A. James Clark, who graduated with an engineering degree in 1950, donated over $45 million to the college of engineering, which also bears his name. Another engineering donor, Jeong H. Kim, earned his Ph.D. from the university in 1991 and gave $5 million for the construction of a state-of-the-art engineering building. Philip Merrill, a media figure, donated $10 million to the College of Journalism. Robert E. Fischell, physicist, inventor, and holder of more than 200 U.S. and foreign medical patents donated $30 million to the A. James Clark School of Engineering, establishing the Fischell Department of Bioengineering. Brendan Iribe, a co-founder of Oculus VR, donated $31 million to the university in 2014 towards a new computer science building and scholarships.

== See also ==
- Shuping Yang commencement speech controversy
- Monroe H. Martin Prize
