= Morrill Hall (University of Maryland) =

Academic building in College Park, MD, USA

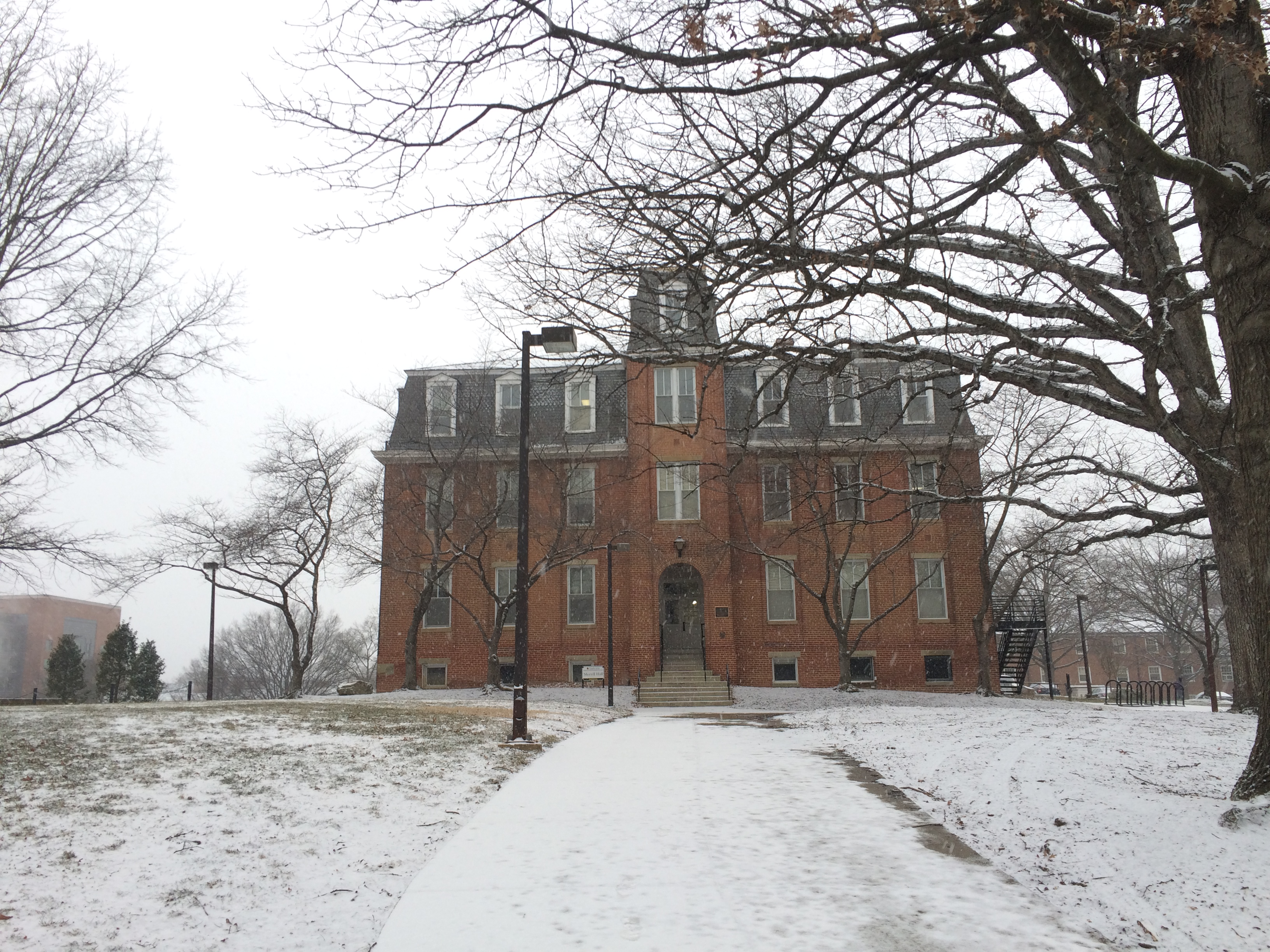
- Morrill Hall in February 2019
- Interactive map of the Morrill Hall area

General information
- Status: Oldest academic building on campus
- Type: Academic
- Architectural style: Second Empire
- Location: Morrill Quad; University of Maryland, College Park campus
- Coordinates: 38°59′03″N 76°56′39″W
- Named for: Justin Morrill
- Completed: 1898

Design and construction
- Architect: Henry B. McDonnell

Morrill Hall is the oldest continuously used academic building on the campus of the University of Maryland, College Park. Built in 1898 in the Second Empire architectural style for $24,000, it was the sole academic building left untouched by The Great Fire of 1912 which devastated almost all of campus. Originally known as Science Hall, the building was renamed for Senator Justin Morrill, father of the Morrill Land-Grant Colleges Act (from which the university received funds in 1864). Morrill Hall has housed numerous departments over the years, including the Zoology and Veterinary Science Departments. The three-story building currently houses a number of offices in the College of Behavioral and Social Sciences, including the Center for American Politics and Citizenship. Morrill Hall is currently being considered for addition to the Prince George's County historic landmark list. It most recently underwent a renovation in 2003.

Campus lore depicts the building as being haunted by ghosts of the American Civil War. In the years following its construction, Morrill Hall was noted for the view of the Washington Monument which could be seen from its cupola. The Senior Gift of the Class of 2009 led to the establishment of an arboretum in the Morrill Quad.
