= Clarence Mitchell =

Clarence Mitchell may refer to:

- Clarence Mitchell (baseball) (1891–1963), American Major League Baseball pitcher
- Clarence Mitchell (bishop), Canadian Suffragan Bishop of the Diocese of Niagara
- Clarence Mitchell Jr. (1911–1984), American civil rights activist
- Clarence Mitchell III (1939–2012), American politician from Baltimore, Maryland
- Clarence Mitchell IV (born 1962), American radio host and former politician
- Clarence C. Mitchell (1897-1986), American lawyer and politician
- Brick Mitchell (Clarence Leon Mitchell, c. 1894–1963), American football player and coach
