= University of Maryland College of Agriculture and Natural Resources =

College of the University of Maryland

Coordinates: 38°59′30″N 76°56′27″W

College of Agriculture and Natural Resources
- Type: Public
- Established: 1856
- Dean: Wendy Powers
- Location: College Park, Maryland, United States
- Campus: Suburban
- Website: http://www.agnr.umd.edu/

The University of Maryland College of Agriculture and Natural Resources is the agricultural and environmental sciences college of the University of Maryland and operates the Maryland Sea Grant College in cooperation with the University of Maryland Center for Environmental Science and the National Oceanic and Atmospheric Administration.

Founded in 1856 as the Maryland Agricultural College in College Park, Maryland, it eventually went on to become the core of what is now the University of Maryland. The college offers both undergraduate and graduate degree programs in a variety of fields related to agriculture and environmental studies. Maryland's College of Agriculture and Natural Resources is often ranked among the better agricultural sciences schools in the United States.

== History ==
The history of the College of Agriculture and Natural Resources at the University of Maryland is simply the history of the university itself. The University of Maryland was chartered in 1856 as the Maryland Agricultural College. Charles Benedict Calvert spent $21,000 to purchase 420 acres in College Park, Maryland, and later that year founded the college. The school opened on October 5, 1859, with a total of 34 students.

In 1864, the state legislature designated it as a land grant college under the Morrill Act of 1862, which made federal funds available. By the end of the Civil War, the university, having been hit hard by financial problems and a decline in student enrollment, found itself bankrupt. The state legislature assumed half ownership of the school in 1866, which pulled the college out of bankruptcy, and made the college, in part, a state institution. Enrollment slowly increased at the university, and over the next 26 years, Maryland gained a reputation as a strong research institution.

The federally funded Maryland Agricultural Experiment Station was established under the Hatch Act of 1887, and was opened in 1888 at the college. Focused on helping farmers, the Ag Station worked with faculty, staff and students. New state laws granted the college regulatory control over several areas of agriculture and public safety.

In 1920, the Maryland General Assembly merged the Baltimore and College Park campuses, forming the University of Maryland, College Park. The College of Agriculture was one of its thirteen units. continued to be a main part of the curriculum. Its first dean was P. W. Zimmerman. The College of Agriculture included agronomy, animal, husbandry, dairy husbandry, forestry, horticulture, plant morphology and mycology, plant pathology, plant physiology and poultry husbandry. Harry J. Patterson replaced Zimmerman in 1925, while also serving as the director of the Agricultural Experiment Station. He was replaced by Thomas B. Symons in 1938.

The College of Agriculture became the College of Agriculture and Natural Resources in 1995. The college also administers the Agricultural Experiment Station. The college has expanded its academic programs. Wendy Powers became dean of the College of Agriculture and Natural Resources in July 2025.

== Campus ==
Research and education centers

- Central Maryland Research & Education Center
- Lower Eastern Shore Research & Education Center
- University of Maryland, Eastern Shore
- Western Maryland Research & Education Center
- Wye Research & Education Center

== Academics ==
=== Departments and degree options ===
==== Agricultural and Resource Economics ====
- Business Management
- Environmental and Resource Policy
- Food Production
- International Agriculture
- Political Process

==== Agricultural Science and Technology ====
- Agricultural Science Education

==== Animal and Avian Sciences ====
- Animal Care and Management
- Animal Biotechnology
- Equine Studies
- Laboratory Animal Management
- Pre-Veterinary medicine
- Sciences/Pre-Professional

==== Environmental Science and Policy ====
- Environment and Agriculture
- Environmental Economics
- Environments Restoration and Management
- Soil, Water, and Land Resources
- Wildlife Ecology and Management

==== Environmental Science and Technology ====
- Ecology Technology and Design
- Environmental Health
- Natural Resource Management
- Soil and Watershed Science

==== Institute of Applied Agriculture ====
- 2-year certificate
  - Agribusiness, concentrations in Equine Management and Sustainable Agriculture
  - Golf Course Construction Management
  - Golf Course Management
  - Landscape Management
  - Ornamental Horticulture Management
  - Sports Turf Management
  - Turfgrass Management

==== Nutrition and Food Science ====
- Dietetics
- Food Science
- Nutritional Science

==== Plant Science and Landscape Architecture ====
- Landscape Architecture
- Plant Science
  - Horticulture and Crop Production
  - Landscape Management
  - Plant Science
  - Turf and Golf Course Management
  - Urban Forestry

==== Virginia–Maryland College of Veterinary Medicine ====
- Virginia–Maryland College of Veterinary Medicine, Blacksburg, Virginia
- Virginia–Maryland College of Veterinary Medicine, College Park, Maryland

Partnerships

The University of Maryland's partnership with the United States Department of Agriculture started in 1957, collaborating in such areas as dairy, agronomy, horticulture and agricultural biotechnology research. The USDA's Henry A. Wallace Beltsville Agricultural Research Center in Beltsville, Maryland works with the University of Maryland on agriculture, environmental, and natural sciences.

=== Research ===
- Center for Agriculture and Natural Resource Policy
- Center for Food, Nutrition, and Agriculture Policy
- Center for Food Safety and Security Systems
- Hughes Center for Agro-ecology
- Joint Institute for Food Safety and Applied Nutrition
- Maryland Agriculture Experiment Station
- Northeastern Regional Aquaculture Center
- Research Greenhouse Complex

=== Rankings ===
- Among ‘top 15’ green colleges - Grist
- Agriculture and Resource Economics is the #1 program in Resource and Environmental Economics and #3 in Agricultural Economics.
- The Department of Agriculture and Resource Economics is ranked #3 worldwide among academic Agricultural Economics Departments by Research Papers in Economics (RePEc).

=== Scholarships ===
The University of Maryland College of Agriculture and Natural Resources boasts a multitude of unique scholarship opportunities for students, often made possible due to the alumni, and donations. The college has 44 scholarships with 12 additional scholarships from the University of Maryland. It also offers four travel scholarships.

=== Study abroad ===
Started in 1998, the International Programs in Agriculture and Natural Resources (IPAN) was developed to encourage research, education, and outreach across the globe. The programs help other countries to improve their crop production, livestock management, and conservation practices. In return, the university and its students gain valuable knowledge and experience of other countries and cultures abroad. IPAN study abroad programs are based in numerous countries, included Azerbaijan, China, Costa Rica, France, Georgia, India, Italy, Kazakhstan, Peru, Russia, Taiwan, Turkey, and Uzbekistan.

== Student life ==
=== Fraternities and sororities ===
- Alpha Gamma Rho is a social and professional fraternity open to all men from the College of Agriculture and Natural Resources, the College of Chemical and Life Sciences, and men with agricultural backgrounds.
- Alpha Zeta is a professional fraternity made up of both men and women pursuing educational and/or career fields in agriculture. It is the oldest agriculture fraternity, founded in 1897. Its chapter at the university is the Maryland Chapter.
- Sigma Alpha is a professional sorority, promoting agriculture on a local, state, and national level. The group emphasized professional development, close friendships, and ties to the surrounding Greek community. The chapter are the university is Beta Alpha.

=== Student organizations ===
- Agriculture and Natural Resources Student Council is a group of student representatives from each club in the college. They are responsible for coordinating the Fall Bash, Ag Day, and the AGNR Banquet. All students are welcome to participate.
- Animal and Avian Sciences Graduate Student Association (AASGSA) is involved in many social activities within the college, to promote graduate student interaction between other students, faculty, and staff.
- College of Agriculture and Natural Resources Student Ambassadors promote the growth, development, and image of the College of Agriculture and Natural Resources. They serve as communication links between students, faculty, and the administration. Provide support and carry out selected activities of the college. They are also public role models for the College of Agriculture and Natural Resources. Over 20 students are invited to represent the college, based on their academic achievement and leadership potential.
- College Park Environmental Group Promoting Environmental Activism and Appreciation (CPEG) promotes environmental awareness. The group is involved in community service, recreation, and education.
- Collegiate 4-H is an organization that provides its members with a sense of identity on campus, enriches their lives through group projects and recreation, and develops confidence and leadership skills. Mainly the chapter here at the University of Maryland, College Park provides leadership and organization to the College Park Clovers 4-H Club in combination with Prince George's County 4-H, while also engaging in a variety of fundraising efforts. Within our club, there are opportunities to travel including the Northeast Regional Conference held each fall and the National Collegiate Conference held each spring. Collegiate 4-H is open to all students who wish to support youth and the 4-H program. It is not necessary to have prior 4-H experience, only to have an interest in the 4-H ideals and in serving your community.
- Equestrian Club is open to undergraduate, and graduate students, as well as faculty, and staff. Club members participate in riding and training of the on-campus horses, along with their daily care.
- Food and Nutrition Club (FAN Club) is designed to unite and support the students of the Department of Nutrition and Food Science. Members develop leadership skills, while also receiving educational and career opportunities. The group helps surrounding Maryland communities understand food and nutrition through club programs and activities.
- Food Technology Club is part of the National Institute of Food Technologists Student Association. The club strives to enhance students' professional development and leadership skills, and also provide members with career opportunities. Some activities include: Product development, College Bowl, Undergraduate Research Paper Competition, tours of local companies, and guest speakers.
- MANRRS works to promote academic and professional advancement of Minorities in Agriculture and Natural Resources, as well as related Sciences. Their main objectives are: to promote programs in agriculture, natural resources, and the related sciences at the university and in the community; to attract and retain diverse racial and ethnic backgrounds in AGNR programs; and to provide academic, social, and professional support and networking opportunities for students in the programs of agriculture, natural resources, and related sciences.
- National Resources Management Society (NRMT) society welcomes all students interested in environmental professions. The group participates in tree planting, stream clean-ups, camping, canoeing, and hosting guest speakers.
- University of Maryland Animal Husbandry Club helps to develop future leaders, build strong interpersonal relationships, and promote the industry of animal agriculture. The group holds field trips to sheep, swine, dairy, beef, and horse farms. They also participate in the sponsorship of the livestock show on Ag Day.
- Veterinary Science Club is a group of students sharing an interest in the field of veterinary science and an official member of the American Pre-Veterinary Medical Association. The club works to promote a better understanding of the numerous opportunities in veterinary medicine, update students with the latest veterinary school information, and share information on veterinary and animal experiences.

== Notable people ==
=== Alumni ===
- Kwesi Ahwoi (Postgraduate Certificate 1986), Minister for Food and Agriculture in Ghana
- J. Scott Angle (M.S. Soil Microbiology 1978), senior vice president for Agricultural and Natural Resources at the University of Florida and leader of the Institute of Food and Agricultural Sciences
- Richard R. Arnold (M.S. Marine Estuarine Environmental Science 1992), NASA astronaut
- Lester R. Brown (M.S. Agricultural Economics 1959), author and founder of the Worldwatch Institute and the Earth Policy Institute
- Robert F. Chandler Jr. (Ph.D. Pomology 1934), president of the University of New Hampshire; helped to establish the International Rice Research Institute in the Philippines where he led the development of new varieties of rice
- George Demas (B.S. Agronomy 1998), pedologist whose pioneering studies of subaqueous soil contributed to the understanding of soil formation
- Mylo S. Downey (M.S. Agronomy 1940), director of the Maryland and Federal 4-H and co-founder of the International Farm Youth Exchange
- Geary Eppley (B.S. 1920, M.S. 1926), college track coach and director and chairman of athletics at the University of Maryland, first president of the Atlantic Coast Conference, as well as a co-founder of the conference
- Albin Owings Kuhn (B.S. 1938, Ph. D. 1948), chancellor for both Baltimore City and County University of Maryland campuses; executive vice president of the University System of Maryland
- Fred Shank (Ph.D. Nutrition 1969), Director of the Center for Food Safety and Applied Nutrition of the Food and Drug Administration
- William W. Skinner (B.S. 1895, Honorary D.Sc. 1917), chemist, conservationist, and college football coach
- Thomas B. Symons (M.S. Agriculture 1904), acting president of the University of Maryland, dean of agriculture and director of the Agricultural Experiment Station of the University of Maryland

=== Notable faculty ===
- William E. Bickley, entomologist and former head of the Entomology Department and professor at the University of Maryland
- Harry J. Patterson, former dean of agriculture
- Thomas B. Symons, former dean of agriculture and director of the Agricultural Experiment Station of the University of Maryland
