= List of University of Maryland, College Park Campus Buildings =

The academic and administrative buildings and the residence halls located on the campus of the University of Maryland, College Park. The campus is located in College Park, Maryland.

== Academic and administrative buildings ==
Building	Image	Constructed	Notes	Reference
Adele H. Stamp Student Union		1954	The student union was first built in 1954. Additions were made in 1962 and 1971. In 1983 the student union was named for Adele Hagner Stamp, the dean for women from 1920 to 1966.	
Architecture Building		1971	The current architecture building was constructed in 1971. In 1947, the Architecture Annex was located in Temporary Building DD.	
Parren J. Mitchell Art-Sociology Building		1976	In 2015, the building was named in honor of Parren J. Mitchell, a former congressman and civil rights leader who was the first African American to obtain a graduate degree from the University of Maryland in 1952.	
A. James Clark Hall (AJC)		2017		
Atlantic Building (formerly Computer and Space Sciences)		1963	Renovated 1996. Contains the Institute for Physical Science and Technology (IPST), Joint Quantum Institute (JQI), Joint Center for Quantum Information and Computer Science (QuICS), and Condensed Matter Theory Center (CMTC). Adjoins the Physical Sciences Complex.	
A.V. Williams Building		1988		
Benjamin Building		1966	The building houses the College of Education. It was named after Harold Benjamin the Dean of the College of Education from 1947 to 1952.	
Biology-Psychology Building		1971	The Building was originally named the Zoology-Psychology Building and was renamed in 1998.	
Biosciences Research Building		2008		
Brendan Iribe Center		2019		
Cambridge Community Center		1961	Formerly named Dining Hall #2 and Cambridge Area Dining Hall.	
Chemistry Building		1951	Formerly named the Physical Sciences Building. In 1960 the Drake Lecture Halls were named. In 1967 an addition was built and in 1969 the east wing was added.	
Chincoteague Hall		1956	Originally the Journalism Building. In 2011, the building underwent a $7.1 million facelift and was renamed. It now houses offices for the College of Behavioral and Social Sciences.	
Clarence M. Mitchell Building		1958	Named for Clarence Mitchell Jr., noted civil rights activist and native Marylander.	
Clarice Smith Performing Arts Center		2001	Named for visual artist Clarice Smith, the 318,000-square-foot (29,500 m2) facility, houses six performance venues, the University of Maryland School of Music, the School of Theatre, Dance, and Performance Studies, and the Michelle Smith Performing Arts Library.	
Cole Activities Building		1955	The building was constructed in 1955 and in 1956 a swimming wing was added. It is named for Judge William P. Cole, Jr. a chairman for the Board of Regents.	
Computer Science Instructional Center		2002	The building was built for Computer Science classroom space. The fourth floor is the home of the Center for Scientific Computation and Mathematical Modeling.	
E. A. Fernandez Idea Factory		2022	The Idea Factory is an addition to the Jeong H. Kim Engineering building and has 60,000 square feet of research space.	
Edward St. John Learning & Teaching Center (ESJ)		2017		
Francis Scott Key Hall		1932	The east wing of the building was built in 1932. The main section was added in 1939. In 1954, the building was named for Francis Scott Key.	
Geology Building		1935	The building was originally called the Bureau of Fisheries, U.S. Fish & Wildlife Service Bldg. In 1968 the university was transferred ownership of the building from the federal government. It was renovated in 1982.	
Harrison Laboratory and Greenhouses		1950	The original headhouse and plant lab were built in 1950. Multiple additions were made in the following years: 1956, 1957, 1959, 1967, 1981. It was named for Orlando Harrison a State Senator and Horticulturist.	
H.J. Patterson Hall		1931	It was named in 1954. An addition was built in 1967.	
Holzapfel Hall (Horticulture)		1934	It was named Holzapfel Hall in 1954 after Henry Holzapfel, Jr. a chairman on the Board of Regents from 1941 to 1943.	
Hornbake Library		1972	It was named after R. Lee Hornbake a Vice President of the university. It houses the Maryland Room and the many archives of the university.	
Instructional Television Facility		1980		
J.M. Patterson Building		1953	It was named in 1954. The north end wing was added in 1976.	
Jeong H. Kim Engineering Building		2005		
Jimenez Hall		1962	An addition was built in 1971. It was named the Juan Ramon Jimenez Bldg. in 1981.	
Jull Hall		1953	It comprises three buildings. It was named after Morley A. Jull, who was head of the Poultry Department.	
Knight Hall		2010	The building houses the Philip Merrill College of Journalism. The building cost approximately $30 million to build.	
LeFrak Hall		1928	Houses the Department of Geography	
Marie Mount Hall		1940	The hall was originally an addition to Silvester Hall and was called the Home Economics Bldg. In 1947, the addition was renovated. It was first named Margaret Brent Hall in 1959. It was renamed Marie Mount Hall in 1969. In 1980, it underwent another renovation and an addition.	
Martin Hall		1949	The hall consists of classrooms and laboratories for the different departments of the School of Engineering. Its full name is Glenn L. Martin Hall.	
McKeldin Library		1958	It was named after Theodore R. McKeldin a Governor of Maryland and Mayor of Baltimore City.	
Microbiology Building		1932	It was originally the U.S. Bureau of Mines Bldg. In 1968, the university received ownership from the federal government. In 1980, it was renamed to the Microbiology Bldg.	
Morrill Hall		1898	Originally called the Science Hall, Morrill Hall is the oldest continuously used academic building on campus.	
Nyumburu Cultural Center		1996	The current location of the center was constructed in 1996. It was located in a temporary building in 1973 and then moved to the South Campus Dining Hall in 1978.	
Physical Sciences Complex		2013	Adjoins the Atlantic Building	
Physics Building		1952	Additions were built in 1962 and 1964. The west wing was added in 1967.	
Preinkert Field House		1932	An addition and a pool were built in 1951. The field house was named after Alma H. Preinkert a Registrar for the university from 1919 to 1954.	
Reckord Armory		1944	The armory was named in 1961 after Major General Milton A. Reckord, an Adjutant General of Maryland.	
Ritchie Coliseum		1932		
Rossborough Inn		1798-1812	Originally built as an inn and tavern for travelers on the old Washington and Baltimore Turnpike (today's U.S. Route 1), the building was donated to the Maryland Agricultural College in 1858. Over the years, the building has been used by the university for various purposes, including as a faculty residence, an agricultural facility, an alumni club, and a restaurant. Today, the building houses the Office of Undergraduate Admissions.	
School of Public Health Building		1973	It was originally named Health & Human Performance Building but was renamed in 2008. Renovated 2010.	
SECU Stadium		1950	Home stadium for Maryland Terrapins football, it has an official capacity of 51,802. Formerly known as Byrd Stadium, after Harry C. Byrd, president of the university from 1935 to 1954, the name was changed to Maryland Stadium in 2015, and to its current name in 2022.	
Shoemaker Building		1931	Location of the UMD Counseling Center.	
Shriver Laboratory		1938	The building houses the Office of Human Relations Program. It was named after George McLean Shriver a member of the Board of Regents.	
Skinner Building		1917	Originally the agricultural building. It housed the administration offices from 1918 to 1931. In 1954 it was named Skinner after W.W. Skinner, a chairman of the Board of Regents from 1935 to 1941.	
South Campus Dining Hall		1974	The building used to be called the Food Services Facility and New Dining Hall.	
Susquehanna Hall		1991	Formerly called the South Campus Surge Building.	
Symons Hall		1940	In 1948 an addition was built. In 1954 it was named Symons Hall after Thomas B. Symons a Dean of the College of Agriculture and acting president of the university. The building now houses the College of Agriculture.	
Taliaferro Hall		1894/96	The west wing was added in 1904. The east wing was constructed in 1909. In 1925 the building housed the Engineering Departments. In 1954 it was named Taliaferro after Thomas Hardy Taliaferro, a dean of the College of Engineering and dean of the College of Arts and Sciences.	
Tawes Fine Arts Building		1965	The building was renovated in 2008.	
Thurgood Marshall Hall		2022	Home to the School of Public Policy. Named for Thurgood Marshall in 2023.	
Turner Hall		1924	The building was nicknamed the "Shirt Factory." It was renovated in 1940 and 1948. In 1954 it was named after Philip C. Turner a member of the Board of Regents. Previously known as the Dairy, which moved to STAMP, Turner Hall currently houses UMD Visitor Services & Welcome Desk. The building once featured a cafe that sold sandwiches and ice cream.	
Tydings Hall		1961	In 1969 the building was named for Millard E. Tydings a U.S. Senator from Maryland.	
Van Munching Hall		1992	A new wing was added in 2002. Currently the building houses the Robert H. Smith School of Business previously housed in Tydings Hall.	
William E. Kirwan Hall		1954	The hall houses the mathematics department. The east wing was added in 1968 and another addition was made in 1981.	
Wind Tunnel Building		1949		
Woods Hall		1948	The building is attached to the Skinner Building. It was named in 1954 after Albert F. Woods a president of the Maryland Agricultural College from 1917 to 1926.	
Yahentamitsi Dining Hall		2022	Named after the Algonquian word meaning "a place to go eat" to honor the Piscataway people indigenous to Maryland.	

== Residence Halls (Dormitories) ==
Building	Image	Constructed	Notes	Reference
Allegany Hall		1954	Named after Allegany County, Maryland.	
Annapolis Hall		1988	Named after Annapolis, Maryland, the Maryland state capital and county seat of Anne Arundel County. The original Annapolis Hall was built in 1924, and was razed and rebuilt in 1988.	
Anne Arundel Hall		1937	Named after Anne Arundel County, Maryland. Anne Arundel Hall was originally called Dormitory B.	
Baltimore Hall		1921	Named after Baltimore County, Maryland. Baltimore Hall was originally named Silvester Hall. In 1954 it was renamed to Baltimore Hall and was renovated in 1970.	
Bel Air Hall		1962	Named after the county seat of Harford County, Bel Air, Maryland. It is a coed, four-story dormitory in the Cambridge Community that can house approximately 119 students.	
Calvert Hall		1914	Named after Calvert County, Maryland, as well as Charles Benedict Calvert, the founder of the Maryland Agricultural College, predecessor of the University of Maryland. Calvert Hall is currently the oldest dorm on campus. It was the first men's dormitory to be built after the Great Fire of 1912. In 1960 the 5th floor was renovated.	
Cambridge Hall		1961	Named after the county seat of Dorchester County, Cambridge, Maryland. It is a coed, four-story dormitory in the Cambridge Community that can house approximately 223 students.	
Caroline Hall		1954	Named after Caroline County, Maryland.	
Carroll Hall		1954	Named after Carroll County, Maryland. From 1919 to 1920, the name originally belonged to a residence that was converted into a dormitory, now razed. It was built in its current location in 1954.	
Cecil Hall		1959	Named after Cecil County, Maryland.	
Centreville Hall		1962	Named after the county seat of Queen Anne's County, Centreville, Maryland.	
Charles Hall		1954	Named after Charles County, Maryland.	
Chestertown Hall		1962	Named after the county seat of Kent County, Chestertown, Maryland.	
Cumberland Hall		1963	Named after the county seat of Allegany County, Cumberland, Maryland.	
Denton Hall	Denton Hall	1964	Named after the county seat of Caroline County, Denton, Maryland.	
Dorchester Hall		1959	Named after Dorchester County, Maryland.	
Easton Hall		1965	Named after the county seat of Talbot County, Easton, Maryland.	
Elkton Hall		1965	Named after the county seat of Cecil County, Elkton, Maryland.	
Ellicott Hall		1966	Named after the county seat of Howard County, Ellicott City, Maryland.	
Frederick Hall		1948	Named after Frederick County, Maryland. In 1959 an addition to the dorm was built.	
Garrett Hall		1948	Named after Garrett County, Maryland.	
Hagerstown Hall		1967	Named after the county seat of Washington County, Hagerstown, Maryland.	
Harford Hall		1944	Named after Harford County, Maryland.	
Howard Hall		1940	Named after Howard County, Maryland. Originally called Dormitory L. In 1946 the 3rd floor was renovated.	
Johnson-Whittle Hall		2022	Named for Ms. Elaine Johnson Coates, the first African American female to graduate with a degree in education in 1959, and Mr. Hiram Whittle, the first African American male to be admitted to the university in 1951.	
Kent Hall		1944	Named after Kent County, Maryland.	
La Plata Hall		1968	Named after the county seat of Charles County, La Plata, Maryland.	
Montgomery Hall		1954	Named after Montgomery County, Maryland.	
Oakland Hall		2011	Named after the county seat of Garrett County, Oakland, Maryland.	
Prince Frederick Hall		2014	Named after the county seat of Calvert County, Prince Frederick, Maryland.	
Prince George's Hall		1944	Named after Prince George's County, Maryland.	
Pyon-Chen Hall		2021	Named for Pyon Su, the first Korean student to receive a degree from any American college or university, and Chunjen Constant Chen, the first Chinese student to enroll at the Maryland Agricultural College.	
Queen Anne's Hall		1949	Named after Queen Anne's County, Maryland.	
Somerset Hall		1949	Named after Somerset County, Maryland.	
St. Mary's Hall		1932	Named after St. Mary's County, Maryland. Originally named Margaret Brent Hall. In 1954 the name was changed to St. Mary's Hall.	
Talbot Hall		1948	Named after Talbot County, Maryland.	
Washington Hall		1940	Named after Washington County, Maryland. In 1946, the 3rd floor was renovated.	
Wicomico Hall		1954	Named after Wicomico County, Maryland.	
Worcester Hall		1959	Named after Worcester County, Maryland.	
