= Lillie May Carroll Jackson =

American activist (1889–1975)

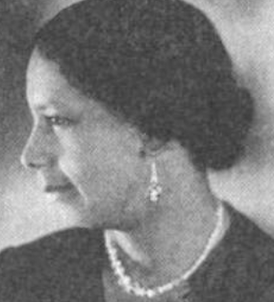
- Lillie M. Jackson, from a 1936 publication
- Born: Lillie May Carroll; May 25, 1889; Baltimore, Maryland, US
- Died: July 5, 1975 (aged 86); Baltimore, Maryland, US
- Known for: civil rights activist, organizer of the Baltimore Branch of the NAACP
- Spouse: Keiffer Albert Jackson (m. 1910)
- Children: 4 (including Virginia and Juanita)

Lillie May Carroll Jackson (May 25, 1889 – July 5, 1975), was a pioneer civil rights activist and organizer of the Baltimore branch of the NAACP. Known as "Dr. Lillie", "Ma Jackson", and the "mother of the civil rights movement", Lillie May Carroll Jackson pioneered the tactic of non-violent resistance to racial segregation used by Martin Luther King Jr. and others during the early civil rights movement.

== Early life and education ==
Born in Baltimore, Maryland, Lillie May Carroll Jackson was the seventh child of Methodist Minister Charles Henry Carroll (who claimed descent from Charles Carroll of Carrollton, a signer of the Declaration of Independence) and Amanda Bowen Carroll who was said to be the granddaughter of a free-born African chief named John Bowen. After completing her public school education and graduating from the Colored High School and Normal School in 1909, Jackson became a second-grade teacher at the old Biddle Street School.

Jackson grew up singing soprano in the choir of the Sharp Street Methodist Church. On an occasion when the church was used to show religious motion pictures, she met Methodist evangelist Keiffer Albert Jackson of Carrollton, Mississippi. A promoter of religious films, Jackson requested that she sing a song entitled "The Holy City". Years later, in 1910, they were married. Once they were married they began to travel together around the country to show films to church congregations. She sang while the silent pictures were shown and lectured wherever he showed his films. This built her public speaking experience and comfort when speaking to large crowds.

Upon the arrival of their first child, the Jackson family settled in Baltimore, where Lillie began to invest in real estate. The proceeds allowed her to support their family and later supported her civil rights activism.

During 1918 Jackson experienced a life changing crisis. She underwent emergency surgery for mastoiditis. The procedure was so extensive her doctor told her that he "had removed more decayed bone from her head than he thought possible to survive". As a result, the right side of her face was permanently disfigured. Most photos of her henceforth were taken from the left side to conceal her scars. Jackson said that before this procedure she prayed to live so she could raise her children, offering up a lifetime of service in return. Some report that she became focused on civil rights activism after her daughters were denied entrance to the universities of their choice due to racial discrimination and segregation in Maryland.

== Civil rights activism ==
As a successful landlord, Jackson was free to engage in activities which led to community improvement. She sponsored the City-Wide Young Peoples forum, supporting her daughter Juanita's leadership of the group in the early 1930s. The forum conducted a campaign to end racial segregation beginning with the grassroots "Buy Where You Can Work" campaign of 1931. Jackson and her daughter Juanita, along with the forums' members, encouraged African-American residents of Baltimore to shop only at businesses where they could work, boycotting businesses with discriminatory hiring practices. The campaign's success led to similar protests in other cities around the country.

=== President of the Baltimore NAACP ===
At one City-Wide Young Peoples Forum gathering, Charles Hamilton Houston, informed the audience "we could sue Jim Crow out of Maryland". Subsequently, Carl Murphy of the Afro-American newspaper suggested that Lillie join forces with the NAACP. She was also asked to revive the local Baltimore NAACP chapter. That was the beginning of her 35-year tenure with the NAACP. Jackson became the president of the Baltimore branch in 1935, a position she held until her retirement in 1970. Every year, she was re-elected unanimously.

==== Legal activism ====
The Baltimore NAACP became known for its legal victories: its power to desegregate institutions and set legal precedent via civil rights lawsuits. Jackson was a mentor to civil rights lawyers like Charles Houston and Thurgood Marshall, and raised funds to support their cases. When Marshall worked for the Baltimore NAACP as a new pro bono lawyer, he would have strategy calls with Jackson where he left his phone on his desk as she laid out legal plans, with Marshall only occasionally speaking to let her know he was still there. Many of the branch's later victories were won by Jackson's daughter Juanita Jackson Mitchell, who eventually became the Baltimore NAACP's lead legal counsel.

Jackson supported one of the earliest public school school desegregation cases, and funded legal efforts across a variety of key civil rights concerns. Jackson was fundamental to Baltimore being the first Southern city to integrate its schools after the landmark Brown v. Board of Education decision. In 1935, Marshall won a landmark case financed by the Baltimore NAACP, Murray v. Pearson, removing the color barrier from admissions to the University of Maryland School of Law. In 1938 the branch's lawyers won a historic legal challenge to racial barriers in publicly funded institutions. A court judgment overturned city policy assuring all Baltimore city school teachers received equal pay. Jackson drove the Baltimore NAACP to extend the fight for equal teacher pay across Maryland. The Baltimore branch's legal fights also led to the first time that black policemen could wear uniforms, rather than remaining in their own clothes while on duty. Many of their cases challenged the constitutionality of segregation across education, employment, and public accommodations. Their lawsuits led to the desegregation of city golf courses, swimming pools, and state parks as well. In one of their largest victories, Baltimore's Fair Employment Practices Law was passed in 1958.

==== Organizing and campaigns ====
Jackson continued to engage in grass-roots campaigns to desegregate state institutions. After the 1933 Eastern Shore lynching of George Armwood, she organized a series of protests with Afro-American Editor Carl Murphy that built public outrage and energy for her future movements. In 1942, she created a voter registration drive, which greatly increased the local political power of black voters and began a shift in city politics. According to the Baltimore NAACP, these gains in voters had been considered impossible just a few years before she did this. At one point, she had the Baltimore NAACP picket a Baltimore whites-only theater for six years until management desegregated.

Jackson was such a force in Maryland and Baltimore politics that Governor Theodore McKeldin was noted to have said of her, "I'd rather have the devil after me than Mrs. Jackson. Give her what she wants." She was known for her persistence and persuasive powers, which came out in force during the marathon telephone calls she was also known for.

Ultimately, her efforts built the Baltimore NAACP into the largest branch of the organization in the United States with a peak membership of 17,600.

=== State and national organizing ===
In 1941, she organized and sponsored the first state convention of all Maryland NAACP branches, bringing together 203 delegates. She was photographed at the convention for coverage in the NAACP's magazine, The Crisis. In 1942 she was named to Maryland's first Interracial Commission.

In 1946 Jackson founded the Maryland state conference of the NAACP, and she served as its president from 1942 until 1962. She traveled across the state's counties to establish a network of local branches that could coordinate on state-level campaigns. Jackson was elected to the NAACP's National Board of Directors in 1948.

In the 1960s, Jackson's organizing power helped secure the passage of federal civil rights laws multiple times, in 1964, 1965, and 1966.

== Personal life ==
Jackson had four children. She had three daughters: Virginia (born June 3, 1911), Juanita Elizabeth (born January 2, 1913) and Marion (born September 12, 1916), followed by one son, Bowen Keiffer (born 1923).

In addition to her leadership, Jackson was figuratively the mother of many activists in the civil rights movement. Her daughter Juanita, was the first African-American woman to practice law in Maryland, and was an activist and lawyer for the NAACP, establishing their national youth organization and providing legal counsel to the Baltimore NAACP chapter, as well as heading the Maryland NAACP. Juanita married Clarence Mitchell Jr. on September 7, 1938. He was the NAACP’s chief Washington lobbyist from 1950 to 1978 and became known as the "101st U.S. Senator." Mitchell's brother Parren Mitchell was the first African-American congressman from Maryland. Juanita and Clarence had four sons: Clarence M. Mitchell, III (a former state senator), Michael Bowen Mitchell Sr. (former state senator and Baltimore City Council member), Keiffer Jackson Mitchell, M.D., and George Davis Mitchell. Kieffer Mitchell's son, Keiffer J. Mitchell Jr. was a Baltimore City Council member and the Maryland House of Delegates. Clarence M. Mitchell, IV was a member of the Maryland State Senate.

Jackson died from a myocardial infarction and was interred at Mount Auburn Cemetery in Baltimore.

== Legacy ==
=== Lillie May Carroll Jackson Museum ===
Jackson's will called for the home she lived in for twenty-two years, 1320 Eutaw Place in Baltimore, to be turned into a museum. She entrusted her daughter Virginia with transforming the house into a museum. As the only museum named after a woman and the only civil rights museum in the state of Maryland, it serves as a repository of civil rights artifacts including documents, framed memorabilia and household furnishings. Prominent amongst these was a life-sized photo of Jackson with Rosa Parks just inside the building's entrance.

Upon its 1976 opening the museum enjoyed a modest flow of visitors. By mid 1990 its maintenance had become untenable to the extent that the structure was no longer viable as a museum. In 1997 Morgan State University took responsibility for the facility and as curators placed its contents in storage. The facility then became dormant, awaiting sufficient matching funds to put in use a grant which was received from the state of Maryland. The museum reopened on June 11, 2016.

=== Honors ===
In 1958, Morgan State College gave her an honorary doctorate of laws for her civil rights activism.

In 1986, Jackson was posthumously inducted into the Maryland Women's Hall of Fame.

The Baltimore Sun named Jackson Marylander of the Century in 1999.

Baltimore mayor Martin O'Malley declared May 25th as Lillie Carroll Jackson Day in the city.

== Bibliography ==
- Hathaway, Phyllis. "Lillie May Jackson," Notable Maryland Women, ed. Winifred G. Helmes (Maryland: Tidewater Publishers, 1977), 187-191.
- Williams, Juan. Thurgood Marshall: American Revolutionary. New York: Random House, 1998.
- Davis, Michael D. and Clark, Hunter R. Thurgood Marshall: Warrior At The Bar, Rebel On The Bench. New York: Carol Publishing Group, 1992.
- Aldred, Lisa. Thurgood Marshall: Supreme Court Justice. New York: Chelsea House Publishers, 1990.
- Hughes, Langston. Fight For Freedom: The Story of the NAACP. New York: W.W. Norton & Co., 1962. 176-179.
