= Harry Patterson =

Harry Patterson may refer to:

- "Harry Patterson", name used by Jack Higgins (1929–2022), British novelist
- Harry Norton Patterson (1853–1919), American printer and botanist
- Harry J. Patterson (1866–1946), president of Maryland Agricultural College
- Harry Paterson (born 2001), Scottish rugby player

== See also ==
- Hal Patterson (1932–2011), American college basketball player and Canadian football player
- Henry Patterson (disambiguation)
