= Claire Simeone =

- Education: University of Maryland, College Park Virginia–Maryland College of Veterinary Medicine University of St Andrews
- Employer: Sea Change Health

Claire Simeone is a veterinarian, advocate for ocean health, and founder at Sea Change Health. She is a 2018 TED Fellow, the first ever veterinarian to be selected.

== Early life and education ==
Simeone was inspired to study science by her father, Anthony Simeone, an environmentalist, as well as by David Attenborough and Sylvia Earle. She received her Bachelor's degree in neurobiology at the University of Maryland, College Park in 2007.During her undergraduate studies, she completed coursework in Molecular Biology at the University of St Andrews. She attended the Virginia–Maryland College of Veterinary Medicine, graduating in 2011 with a Doctor of Veterinary Medicine degree. Simeone worked with the California condor program in San Diego studying treatments for lead toxicity. She completed internships with the National Marine Mammal Foundation and SeaWorld San Diego and cared for the dolphins and sea lions at the U.S. Navy Marine Mammal Program.

== Career ==
In 2013 she joined The Marine Mammal Center as a conservation medicine veterinarian, where she worked jointly with the National Oceanic and Atmospheric Administration National Marine Fisheries Service. She has helped with several unusual mortality event responses and helped in the development of 'Marine Mammal Health M.A.P.', a collaborative effort to create a national marine mammal health data repository and visualization tool. She also helped coordinate a program to provide training for international veterinarians to enhance surveillance efforts around the world. The International Veterinary In-Residence program looks to expand our understanding of how to care for unique species.

Simeone was appointed Director of Kei Kai Ola (the Healing Seal), the conservation and education centre dedicated to the rehabilitation and conservation of endangered Hawaiian monk seals on Hawaiʻi island, in 2018. In 2020 she left The Marine Mammal Center to start Sea Change Health to improve marine malla, human, and conservation health through clinical medicine and research. She is also scientific advisor for SR^{3}, the Sealife Response, Rehab and Research collective, and is a research associate with Fundación Oceanographic in Valencia, Spain.

She is interested in how improved understanding of animal diseases can lead to better health in humans. This work includes understanding the impacts of human-animal interactions, such as in cases of sea lion bites in swimmers. Alongside her work as a clinical veterinarian, Simeone continues to publish research about marine mammal health. She is interested in novel therapies to improve care of marine mammals, with a particular focus on eye diseases. Her work studying pain medications in dolphins was a winner in the 2015 Ocean 180 Contest, a video contest centred on effective communication of ocean science that reaches nearly 40,000 middle school students.

In January 2018 it was announced that Simeone would become the first veterinarian to be chosen as a TED Fellow. Her 2018 talk introduced the concept of zoognosis: the knowledge spread between humans and animals. Her 2021 talk at TEDxCityUHongKong showed how innovative medical techniques hold keys for conservation.

In October 2020 Simeone coordinated a team of veterinary and medical experts to perform the first cell transplant in a California sea lion brain to treat epilepsy. Cronutt is a sea lion affected by domoic acid toxicosis living at Six Flags Discovery Kingdom in Vallejo, California. The transplant technique was developed at the Baraban Laboratory at the University of California, San Francisco.

Simeone is a frequent guest on podcasts, a seasoned speaker at conferences, and currently writing a book about the knowledge that marine mammals share with us.
