= Juanita Jackson Mitchell =

American lawyer and activist (1913–1992)

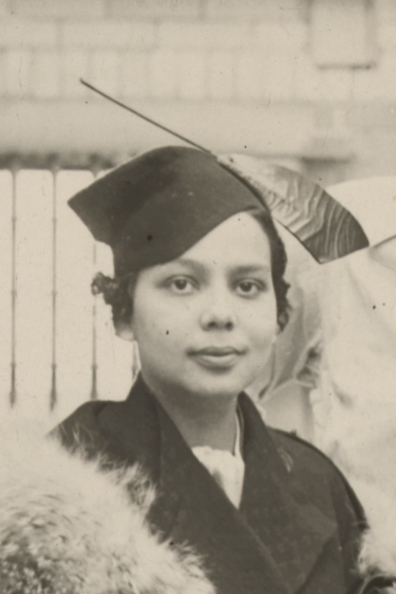
- Juanita Jackson Mitchell, from a 1942 publication.
- Born: Juanita Elizabeth Jackson; January 2, 1913; Hot Springs, Arkansas, U.S.
- Died: July 7, 1992 (aged 79)
- Occupation: Lawyer
- Known for: First African-American woman to practice law in Maryland
- Spouse: Clarence M. Mitchell, Jr.
- Children: 4, including Clarence III
- Mother: Lillie Mae Carroll Jackson

Juanita Elizabeth Jackson Mitchell (January 2, 1913 – July 7, 1992) was the first African-American woman to practice law in Maryland, and was a civil rights activist and organizer with the NAACP.

== Early life and education ==
Mitchell was born in Hot Springs, Arkansas, to Kieffer Albert Jackson and Lillie Mae Carroll Jackson. Mitchell's parents were Methodists who had been traveling the country to evangelize, but they soon returned to Baltimore, where they had met, to have a good environment to raise their children. Lillie became a committed civil rights activist after a major medical crisis in 1918, and built the Baltimore NAACP branch to become one of the organization's most important. She also invested in real estate, which helped support the family.

Mitchell attended Frederick Douglass High School, Morgan State College and graduated, cum laude, from the University of Pennsylvania with a B.S. in education in 1931. At the university, she successfully organized desegregation of the school's dormitories.

That year she also founded and became president of the City-Wide Young People's Forum of Baltimore, a weekly church meeting that organized hundreds of youth across different religious branches and re-energized the local NAACP branch. She organized civil rights discussions, movies and music events, and speech competitions, generally supporting the city's youth and Black community. She also ran weekly lectures, inviting speakers like Mary McLeod Bethune, W. E. B. Du Bois, Ralph Bunche, Nannie Helen Burroughs, Charles Wesley, and Walter White.

In 1933, her group started a local boycott campaign, Buy Where You Can Work, which later spread to many cities under the same name, or under Don't Buy Where You Can't Work. This protested businesses that mainly served Black consumers but only hired white employees. At one local business, the A&P grocery store, the manager believed hiring Black workers would lead current white employees to quit. After a few days of boycotting, the manager caved. The campaign mainly targeted libraries, welfare agencies, and schools, with Mitchell emphasizing that Black people in Baltimore could not be firemen, policemen, or social workers at the time, and had to live in court-enforced ghettos. Buy Where You Can Work led the Enoch Pratt Free Library to sponsor training programs for new Black employees, and the Baltimore Relief Commission to hire five Black social workers, in 1934. The same year, Mitchell was elected vice president of the National Council of Methodist Youth during a conference in Evanston, Illinois, where she encouraged youth to protest Jim Crow laws in the city and organize against lynching.

In 1935, she earned a M.A. in sociology from the University of Pennsylvania as well. She was a member of the Alpha Kappa Alpha sorority.

In 1950, she became the first African-American woman to graduate from the University of Maryland School of Law, and the first African-American woman to practice law in Maryland.

== Career ==
=== Youth and College Division ===
In her earlier years, Mitchell traveled extensively throughout the U.S. for the Bureau of Negro Work and the Methodist church, speaking and teaching courses in race relations. From 1935 to 1938, she was special assistant to Walter F. White, NAACP Executive Secretary. In 1933, White had released a memo to the NAACP Board of Directors critiquing the lack of a standardized youth program in the NAACP, saying that young people's ideas were often stifled. Mitchell and other members lobbied hard to form a new youth program, and in 1935, at the NAACP's 26th annual convention, the Board voted to restructure its youth division, creating the Youth and College Division with Mitchell as its first national director in 1936.

Mitchell wanted to widen the accessibility of the youth division, widening the eligible age range from the previous 14-21 year cutoffs to 12-26, where different age brackets could be in junior youth councils, youth councils, or college chapters. The main goal of these chapters were to support Black youth in becoming community leaders and activists, and this helped build a pipeline of committed NAACP members. Her five objectives in the division were to educate youth about economic, political, and social problems for people of color; supporting national campaigns for antilynching, civil rights, equal education and employment laws; teaching Black history and pride; developing militant and intelligent leaders; and building interracial understanding and cooperation. The main four focuses of most youth councils of the time were campaigns for better rights and laws: equal education, employment opportunities, civil liberties, and antilynching legislation.

Mitchell encouraged councils to host social events to build popularity, and urgent political action as a tactic to produce change. Councils hosted rallies, protests, lawsuits, radio appearances, textbook surveys, and educational campaigns. The younger councils were overseen by an advisor from a nearby NAACP senior branch, while college chapters were independent, reporting directly to the Youth and College Division. This meant programming and events were approved by the same respective advisors. To make a new council or chapter, organizers needed to recruit 25 members, and their dues would be split evenly between the local chapter and national group. These youth organizations were open to anyone of any race, and to be a member of the college chapter you just had to be enrolled in a college or university. She resigned from her position, in spite of White's attempts at persuading her to stay, in 1938 when she married.

=== Civil rights lawyer ===
Mitchell became a civil rights lawyer in 1950, a time when the Baltimore City Bar Association admitted no Black lawyers. She became legal counsel to the local NAACP and eventually head of the Maryland NAACP. She filed lawsuits to make Maryland the first southern state to integrate its public school system after the 1954 United States Supreme Court case, Brown v. Board of Education. She, Thurgood Marshall, and two other attorneys from the NAACP filed suits that successfully admitted two Black teens into the Mergenthaler School of Printing, and she filed a lawsuit to integrate Western High School. She also filed many other cases to desegregate numerous other aspects of segregated life including restaurants, parks and swimming pools. She established case law that ended mass searches of private homes without warrants. She argued cases before the Maryland Court of Appeals, District Court, and U.S. Supreme Court. Mitchell also ran voter registration drives in the 1940s, '50s and '60s to help influence and rally Black citizens in Baltimore.

Mitchell was recognized in the political arena for being a crusader and leader. She was named to the White House Conference on "Women and Civil Rights" by John F. Kennedy and in 1966 she was appointed by President Lyndon B. Johnson to the White House Conference "To Fulfill These Rights" which dealt with finding solutions concerning African Americans in relation to economic security, education and justice. From 1965-1967, she was also co-chairman of the Baltimore mayor's Task Force Committee on Police-Community relations, and she counseled freedom riders and protestors of segregated restaurants at the same time. She spoke frequently against police brutality and mistreatment of Maryland prisoners. In 1985 she helped initiate the Stop the Killing Campaign after four Black teenagers were shot in Baltimore.

== Personal life and death ==
In 1938, Mitchell married Clarence M. Mitchell, Jr., who was known nationally for being a civil rights activist and lobbyist, being dubbed "the 101st Senator" for his success. She was the daughter of Dr. Lillie Jackson, who was also a major civil rights leader and who also was president of the NAACP Baltimore branch and was known as "Mother of Freedom." Juanita Jackson Mitchell came from a long line of civil activists and continued the line. She was the mother of former state senators Michael B. Mitchell and Clarence M. Mitchell III. Her grandson, Clarence M. Mitchell IV was a Member of the Maryland House of Delegates and then a Member of the Maryland State Senate. Her grandson, Keiffer J. Mitchell, Jr., was a member of the Baltimore City Council and ran for Mayor of Baltimore in 2007.

Juanita Mitchell was rendered a quadriplegic in November 1989 after falling down a flight of stairs. While undergoing therapy for that injury, she suffered a stroke, her second since 1985; she was 79. Juanita Jackson Mitchell died in Baltimore of a heart attack and complications from the strokes in July 1992.

== Legacy ==
In 1987, Mitchell was inducted, along with her mother, into the Maryland Women's Hall of Fame.

The NAACP has also recognized Juanita Jackson Mitchell for her accomplishments and has created a "Juanita Jackson Mitchell Award for Legal Activism" to honor her feats as a Black woman in the legal field. Each year, the NAACP, at its National Convention, awards an NAACP Unit for exemplary legal redress committee activities.

A group of lawyers chartered the Everett J. Waring / Juanita Jackson Mitchell Law Society of Howard County ("WMLS") in Maryland on April 23, 1985, to support Howard County's community of Black judges, lawyers, and elected leaders. The organization was named for Mitchell and Everett J. Waring, both of whom it describes as "outstanding African American attorneys of historical significance". The group is affiliated with the Maryland and national bar associations and is involved in community legal outreach, professional mentoring, judicial nominations and civic initiatives.

== See also ==
- List of first women lawyers and judges in Maryland
