= Virginia Jackson Kiah =

American activist

Dr. Virginia Jackson Kiah
- Born: Virginia West Jackson; June 3, 1911; East St. Louis, Illinois, U.S.
- Died: December 28, 2001 (aged 90); Savannah, Georgia, U.S.
- Resting place: Hillcrest Abbey, Savannah, Georgia, U.S.
- Education: Columbia University
- Occupation: Artist
- Mother: Lillie May Carroll Jackson

Virginia Jackson Kiah (June 3, 1911 – December 28, 2001) was an African-American educator and artist who spent a large part of her life in Savannah, Georgia, where Kiah Hall is now named for her.

She was the daughter of civil-rights activist Lillie May Carroll Jackson.

== Early life and career ==
Virginia West Jackson was born in East St. Louis, Illinois, to Keiffer Albert Jackson and Lillie May Carroll Jackson.

Kiah graduated from the Pennsylvania Museum School of Art with a Bachelor of Arts degree in 1931. She followed this up with a Master of Arts degree from Columbia University in 1950.

In 1951, Kiah and her husband of nineteen years, Calvin Lycurgus Kiah, moved to Savannah, Georgia. Calvin was a professor at Georgia State University and Savannah State College during his career. In 1959, they opened the first floor of their home at 505 West 36th Street, in the Cuyler-Brownsville neighborhood, as the Kiah Museum, a teaching facility. The home was built in 1915.

== Personal life ==
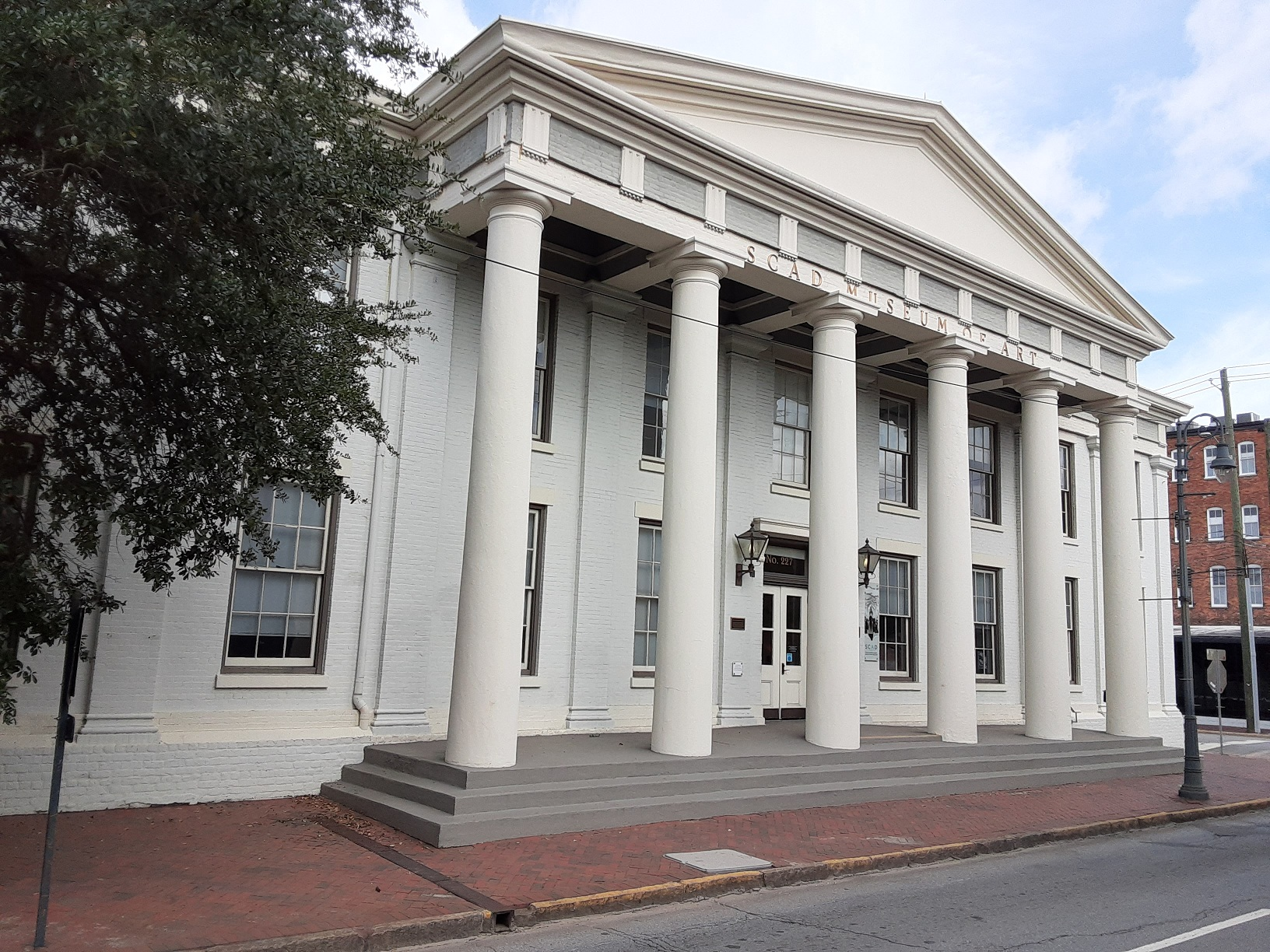
Kiah Hall, Savannah, Georgia

In 1992, Savannah College of Art and Design (SCAD) acquired the deteriorating former Central of Georgia Railroad headquarters building and began renovations. A year later, the building was dedicated to Kiah, a member of SCAD's board of trustees between 1987 and 1997.

Kiah received an honorary doctorate from SCAD in 1986.

In failing health, she moved into a nursing home in 1990.

In 1993, she donated much of her art to the university, which held an exhibition of her work in 2009.

== Death ==
Kiah died in a Savannah nursing home in 2001, aged 90, having survived her husband by seven years. She was interred beside him at Hillcrest Abbey on Wheaton Street in Savannah on December 30.

In 2022, Historic Savannah Foundation (HSF) purchased her former home for $60,000, saving it from demolition due to its ruinous state, having lay vacant for 32 years. They will sell it to a party interested only in restoring the house, a project estimated to cost around $500,000. In November the following year, plans to restore the house received approval from the Metropolitan Planning Commission's Historic Preservation Commission, a step toward converting the house back to a museum.

In 2024, HSF secured approval for the Kiah Museum to be placed on the Georgia Register of Historic Places.
