= J. Scott Angle =

American government official (born 1953)

University of Florida Senior Vice President for Agriculture and Natural Resources Administrative head, UF Institute of Food and Agricultural Sciences
- Incumbent
- Assumed office July 2020
- Preceded by: Rob Gilbert

Personal details
- Born: January 6, 1953 (age 73)
- Spouse: Kay Kelsey
- Education: University of Maryland (BS, MS); University of Missouri (PhD)
- Awards: Fellow of the American Association for the Advancement of Science
- Website: https://ifas.ufl.edu/

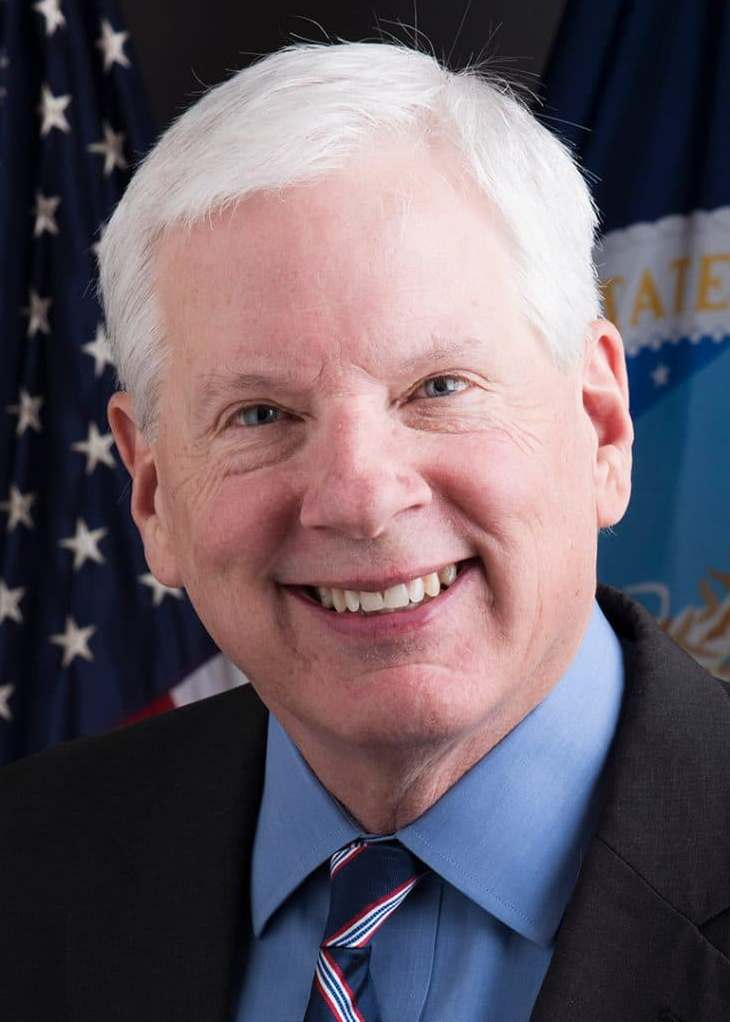
Dr. J. Scott Angle, Director, National Institute of Food and Agriculture

Jay Scott Angle (born January 6, 1953) is the University of Florida's Senior Vice President for Agriculture and Natural Resources and leader of UF's Institute of Food and Agricultural Sciences.

== Early life and education ==
Angle was born in Michigan and grew up in Baltimore, Maryland. Angle received his Bachelor of Science degree in Agronomy and Master of Science in soil science from the University of Maryland. After university, Angle was a Fulbright fellow, and worked at Rothamsted Research in the United Kingdom. He later earned a Ph.D. in soil microbiology from the University of Missouri.

== Career ==
Angle worked for 24 years as a professor of soil science and as an administrator of the Maryland Agricultural Experiment Station and Maryland Cooperative Extension.

From 2005 to 2015, Angle lived in Athens, Georgia, and served as director of the College of Agricultural and Environmental Sciences at the University of Georgia. After leaving the university, Angle worked as president and CEO of the International Fertilizer Development Center. He has authored more than 300 scientific publications. He holds seven patents.

Angle is a fellow in the American Society of Agronomy and the Soil Science Society of America. In 2022, he was elected a fellow of the American Association for the Advancement of Science. In November 2024, he will be inducted as a member of the Academy of Science, Engineering & Medicine of Florida.

=== Director of the National Institute of Food and Agriculture ===
In September 2018, President Donald Trump nominated Angle to a six-year term as the third Director of the National Institute of Food and Agriculture. He was sworn into office on October 29, 2018, by United States Secretary of Agriculture Sonny Perdue.

In 2019, Angle was chosen as the Spring Commencement Speaker for his alma mater, the University of Maryland College of Agriculture and Natural Resources. In October 2020, Angle was honored by his other alma mater with the Distinguished Alumni Award for the University of Missouri's College of Agriculture, Food and Natural Resources.

=== Leader of the University of Florida Institute of Food and Agricultural Sciences ===
In July 2020, Angle became the University of Florida's vice president for agriculture and natural resources and administrative head of the UF Institute of Food and Agricultural Sciences.

In July 2023, Angle was named interim provost. In January 2024, then-UF President Ben Sasse announced that he had removed the "interim" from Angle's title. In September 2024, Angle returned to UF/IFAS and resumed his former job as senior vice president for agriculture and natural resources.
