= Verna L. Jones =

American politician (born 1955)

Verna L. Jones-Rodwell
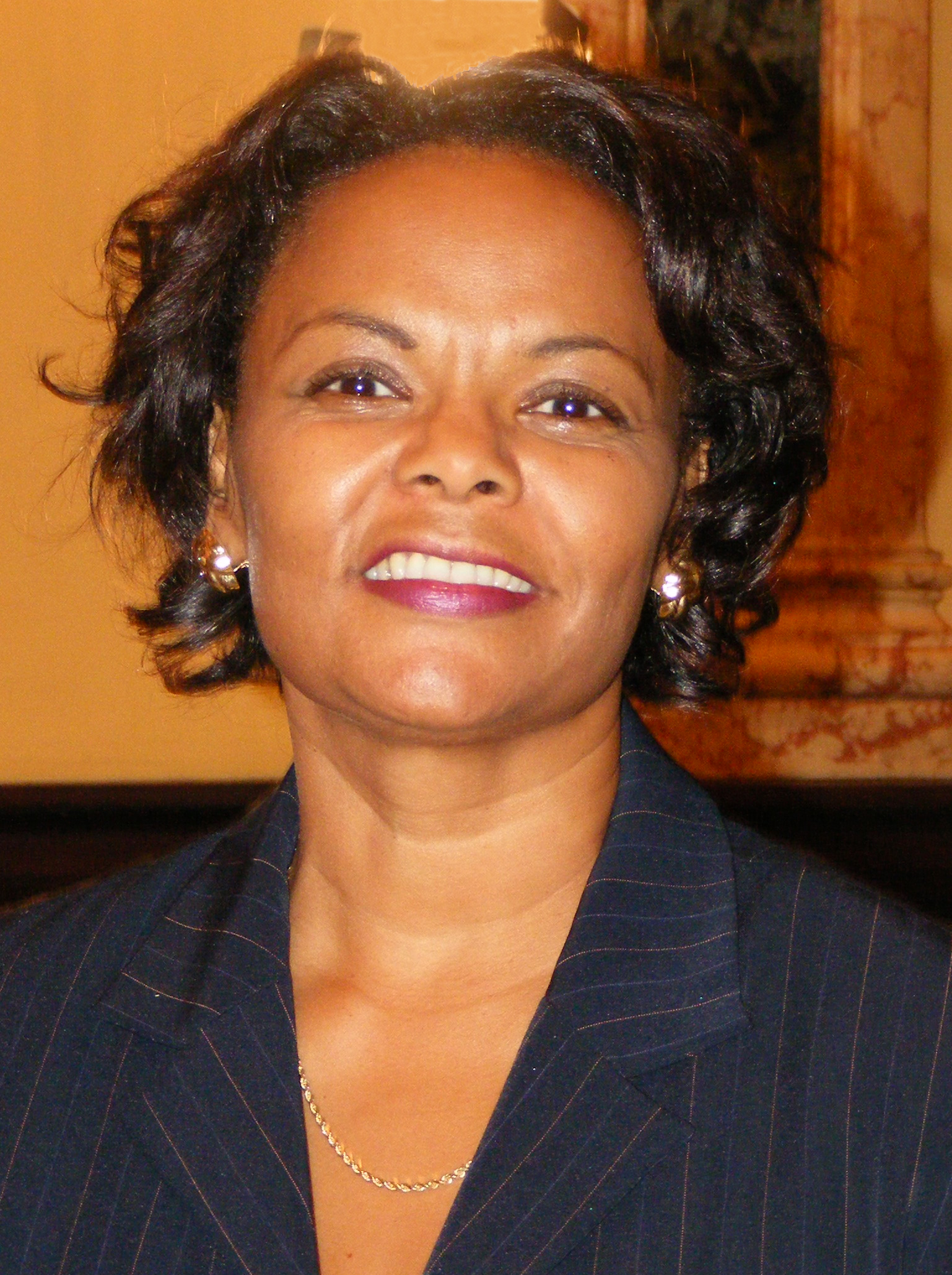
- Jones-Rodwell in 2007

Member of the Maryland Senate from the 44th district
- In office January 2003 – January 14, 2015
- Preceded by: Clarence M. Mitchell, IV
- Succeeded by: Shirley Nathan-Pulliam

Member of the Maryland House of Delegates from the 44th district
- In office 1999–2003
- Preceded by: John D. Jefferies
- Succeeded by: Keith Haynes

Personal details
- Born: November 27, 1955 (age 70) Baltimore, Maryland, U.S.
- Party: Democratic

Verna L. Jones-Rodwell (born November 27, 1955) is an American politician who represented the 44th legislative district in the Maryland State Senate. Senator Jones-Rodwell was also the chair of the Legislative Black Caucus of Maryland from 2007 to 2008.

== Background ==
Jones-Rodwell was born in Baltimore, Maryland on November 27, 1955. She graduated from the University of Maryland College Park, B.A. (urban studies & community organization), 1978; Baruch College, City University of New York, M.P.A., 1987.

== In the legislature ==
Jones-Rodwell became a member of Senate on January 8, 2003. She was assigned to the Senate's Budget and Taxation Committee in 2003. (public safety, transportation & environment subcommittee, 2003-); Joint Committee on Children, Youth, and Families, 2003-; Joint Committee on Federal Relations, 2003-; Special Committee on Substance Abuse, 2003-. Chair, Joint Committee on the Management of Public Funds, 2007-. Member, Special Joint Committee on Pensions, 2003. Jones-Rodwell is a former chair of the Legislative Black Caucus of Maryland and the current chair of the Baltimore City Senate Delegation.

On April 20, 2014, Jones-Rodwell announced that she had decided to retire and would not compete in the upcoming June 2014 democratic primary.

== Awards and designations ==
As a politician and active social life, she served on various key posts, and achieved a number of awards:

- Special Assistant to City Manager, Berkeley, California, 1986-87.
- Director of Local and Regional Programs, Coordinator of Empowerment Zone/Enterprise Communities Initiative and Director of Market Development, Development Training Institute, 1987-97.
- Founder and president, Collaborative Solutions, 1998
- Director, Baltimore Main Streets. Chair, Maryland Public Policy Committee,
- National Black Women's Health Project, 1990-96.
- Board of Directors, Druid Heights Community Development Corporation, 1993-2000.
- President, Women Behind the Community, Inc., 1994-96.
- Board of Directors, Flemming Fellowship Center for Policy Alternatives, 1999.
- Westside Renaissance, Inc., 1999.
- Alzheimer's Association of Greater Maryland, 2001-09.
- Baltimore Heritage, Inc., 2001-. President and Founder,
- Community Building Network, 2002
- Board of Directors, Martha's Place, 2004
- Board of Directors, Alzheimer's Association (national). Delegate, Democratic Party National Convention, 2008.
- Member, Alpha Kappa Alpha Sorority.
- Adjunct faculty, Goucher College.
- Verda F. Welcome Award, Delta Sigma Theta Sorority, Inc., 2001.
- Henry Toll Fellowship, Council of State Governments, 2003.
- Award of Excellence, Maryland Women for Responsible Government, 2003.
- Living Women History Makers' Award.
- National Association of Negro Business and Professional Women's Clubs, Inc., 2004.
- Maryland's Top 100 Women, Daily Record, 2005, 2008, 2011 (Circle of Excellence).
- Dedicated Service Award, Woman Power, Inc., 2006.
- Helen S. Schulze Award for the Advancement of Alzheimer's Research, Alzheimer's Association, 2007.
- Certificate of Appreciation, Maryland Municipal League, 2008.
- Member, Payne Memorial African Methodist Episcopal (AME) Church, Baltimore.
