= Henry Patterson =

Henry Patterson may refer to:

- Henry Patterson (1929–2022), also Harry, British spy and thriller novelist with the pen name Jack Higgins
- Henry A. Patterson (1829–1901), Wisconsin politician
- Hank Patterson (baseball) (1907–1970), catcher in Major League Baseball
- Henry Patterson (boxer), opponent of Alfredo Evangelista
- Henry Patterson (high jumper) (born 1975), American high jumper

== See also ==
- Henry Paterson (born 1997), Australian rugby sevens player
- Harry Patterson (disambiguation)
