= Thomas B. Symons =

American academic (1980-1970)

Thomas Baddeley Symons (September 2, 1880 – July 1970) was an American academic who briefly served as President of the University of Maryland, College Park in 1954.

Symons was born in Easton, Maryland and raised on a farm in Talbot County. He entered Maryland Agricultural College as a student in 1898; initially planning to study agriculture, he was introduced to entomology by Willis Grant Johnson. He earned his undergraduate degree in entomology in 1902, and his master's degree two years later. After receiving his master's, he worked as an entomology assistant at MAC, teaching zoology and entomology, and was later appointed state entomologist, a position which he held from 1905 to 1914. As state entomologist, he co-administered Maryland's State Horticultural Department. He was a member of the Maryland State Horticultural Society, the Maryland Agricultural Society, the National and the Maryland State Grange, and the State Soil Conservation Committee, and was a charter member of the Entomological Society of America. In 1907, he represented Maryland at the Jamestown Exposition.

His administrative career with the Maryland Agricultural College began in 1912, when he was named dean of the School of Horticulture. In 1914 he also became the director of the Cooperative Extension Service. In 1937, Dr. Symons was appointed dean of the University of Maryland College of Agriculture. He remained in both positions until his retirement from the university in 1950.

He returned to the University of Maryland in 1954 to serve as its acting president, until Wilson Homer Elkins was appointed later that year. Symons' major accomplishment during his short tenure was to remodel the Rossburgh Inn as a faculty club. After his brief presidential term, he was appointed to the university's Board of Regents, and later to Maryland's Board of Agriculture.

Symons died in July 1970 at the age of 89. Symons Hall (home to the University of Maryland's Department of Agricultural and Resource Economics, Department of Entomology) in 1954, and several other departments in the College of Agriculture and Natural Resources and the College of Computer, Mathematical, and Natural Sciences were named in his honor.
