= Virginia–Maryland College of Veterinary Medicine =

Public veterinary college in Blacksburg, Virginia, US

Virginia-Maryland College of Veterinary Medicine
- Type: Public Veterinary School
- Established: 1978
- Parent institution: Virginia Tech (Commonwealth of Virginia); University of Maryland (State of Maryland)
- Dean: M. Daniel Givens
- Faculty: VT (470), UMD (23)
- Students: 700+
- Location: Blacksburg, Virginia, U.S. 37.218°N 80.428°W
- Accreditation: AVMA COE, AAALAC, CEPH, and AAHA
- Colors: Chicago maroon and Burnt orange
- Website: www.vetmed.vt.edu

The Virginia–Maryland College of Veterinary Medicine (also known as the Virginia–Maryland Regional College of Veterinary Medicine) is the veterinary school of Virginia Tech and the University of Maryland, College Park — both of which are public research universities in the Commonwealth of Virginia and the State of Maryland, respectively. The college was created as a joint venture of the two universities and their respective state governments in order to fill the need for veterinary medicine education in both states. Students from both states are considered "in-state" students for admissions and tuition purposes.

It is one of 34 colleges of veterinary medicine in the United States and is accredited by the American Veterinary Medical Association's Council on Education and the Association for Assessment and Accreditation of Laboratory Animal Care International. In 2011, the U.S. News 'Veterinary Medicine' Ranking placed the college tied for 17th with Iowa State University in a poll of 25 ranked schools.

The college is considered a constituent college of both Virginia Tech and the University of Maryland. The college's main campus is located on Virginia Tech's campus in Blacksburg, with a branch on the University of Maryland's campus in College Park. It also operates the Marion duPont Scott Equine Medical Center in Leesburg, Virginia. The college's Doctor of Veterinary Medicine (DVM) program is designed to be finished in four years.

== History ==
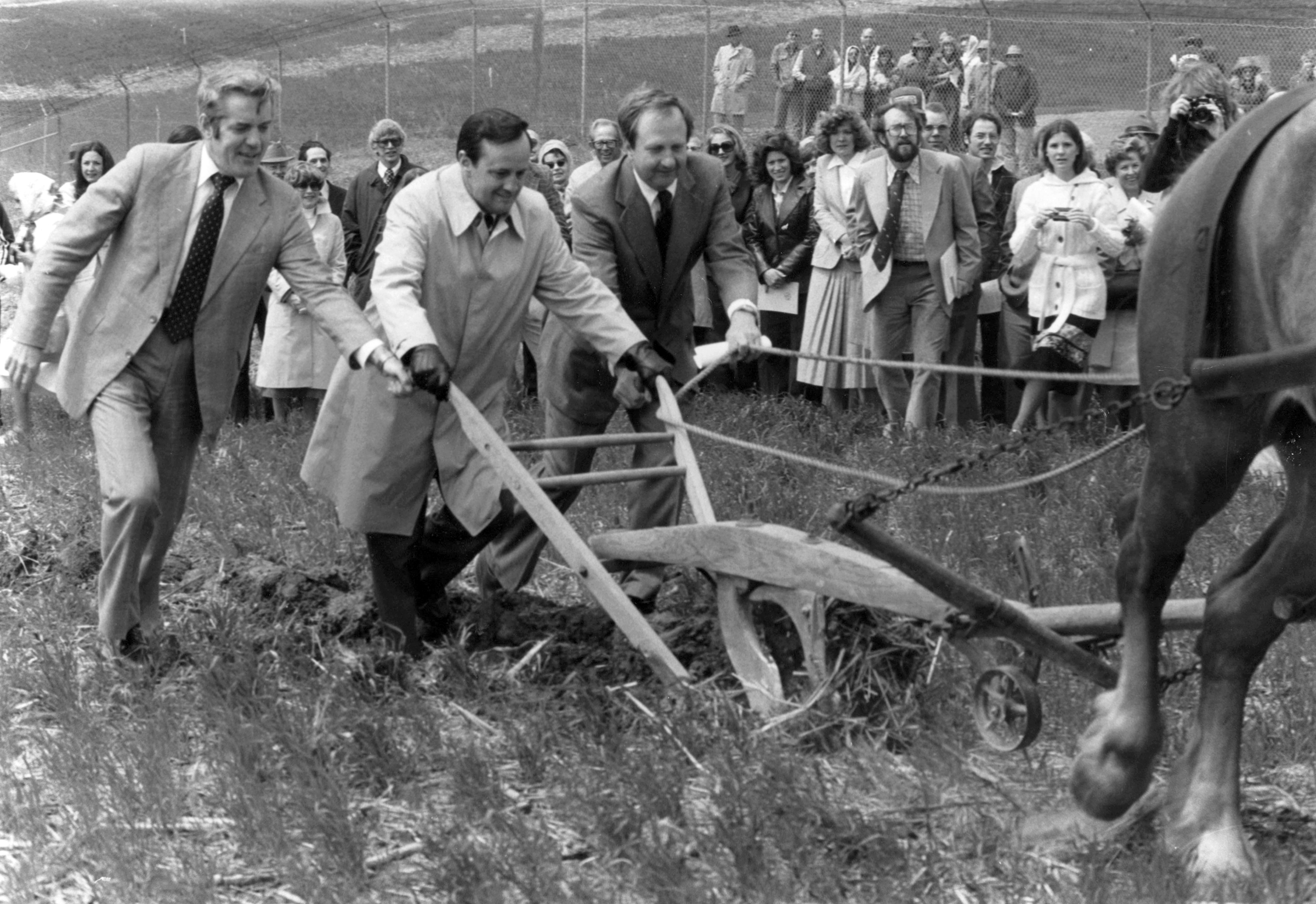
The Virginia-Maryland Regional College of Veterinary Medicine broke ground on April 16, 1979.

Historically, there was a shortage of veterinary colleges in the southern and Mid-Atlantic states. In 1950, the state of Maryland began a contract to allow 10 Maryland students to attend the vet school at the University of Georgia in exchange for the admittance of 10 Georgians into the University of Maryland School of Dentistry. By 1972, Maryland expanded its relationship with out-of-state vet schools to include Tuskegee University, Ohio State University, University of Florida, University of Pennsylvania, and Cornell University. Virginia also tried to address the absence of an in-state veterinary school. In 1971, Virginia entered into contracts administered by the Southern Regional Education Board, allotting 15 seats to Virginia students in the University of Georgia's veterinary school and two seats at Tuskegee University's school.

In June 1971, the Virginia Veterinary Medical Association initiated a study of the need for and feasibility of a college of veterinary medicine. In 1973, a commission of veterinarians and members of the Virginia General Assembly found that Virginia did need a veterinary college to adequately meet its need for veterinary services. The commission recommended that this college should be a regional college, should emphasize service to farmers in Virginia, and should be located at Virginia Tech.

In 1978, the Virginia General Assembly officially established the college as a part of Virginia Tech, one of Virginia's two land-grant universities. Meanwhile, in Maryland, the State Board of Regents decided in 1977 to establish a veterinary school at the University of Maryland, Eastern Shore; however, on May 11, 1979, the Board of Regents decided to join the Virginia school instead. In February 1980, a memorandum of understanding with the then-Virginia school stated that 24 slots in the entering class would be reserved for Maryland students and 40 places would be allocated to Virginia students. This founding class of 64 students entered the college on September 15, 1980 and graduated with DVM degrees in June 1984. The new college was fully accredited by the American Veterinary Medical Association in 1990.

The college opened a $10.5 million, 16,000-square-foot Infectious Disease Research Facility in November 2011 and completed a $14.1 million, 30,000-square-foot Veterinary Medicine Instruction Addition in the fall of 2012. Located on the Blacksburg campus, both facilities connect to the main college complex.

Starting with the Class of 2016, the college expanded the number of students in its DVM program. Of the 120 anticipated spots, 50 are reserved for Virginia residents and 30 for Maryland residents. The remaining spots are for at-large applications and include space for up to six West Virginia residents under a new agreement.

== Academics ==
The Virginia–Maryland College of Veterinary Medicine offers students a DVM degree or an M.S. or Ph.D. in biomedical and veterinary sciences. The college also has a joint program with the Virginia Tech Carilion School of Medicine that leads to a master of public health. In addition to these degrees, students may participate in residency and internships in their desired fields of interest.

=== Rankings ===
U.S. News & World Report rankings
- Veterinary Medicine: 19

The College of Veterinary Medicine has a Veterinary Medicine program, which was ranked among the top 20 programs in the United States by the U.S. News & World Report in 2026.

=== Doctor of Veterinary Medicine program ===
The college offers a four-year full-time program leading to the Doctor of Veterinary Medicine (DVM) degree. In 2016, it launched a new DVM curriculum that integrates the basic and clinical sciences, incorporates team-based learning, and allows for early entry into the clinics. Veterinary students complete three years of classroom instruction and 12 months of clinical rotations in total. The curriculum also allows students to choose a track in small animal, food animal, equine, mixed species, or public/corporate veterinary medicine.

Over the past five years, the Virginia–Maryland College of Veterinary Medicine's DVM program has had over 97 percent of its students pass the North American Veterinary Licensing Examination (NAVLE). In 2013–14, all of the college's 95 graduating students passed the exam.

=== Biomedical and Veterinary Sciences program ===
The Biomedical and Veterinary Sciences program is part of the Graduate School at Virginia Tech. The program offers a Ph.D. degree that requires 90 credit hours of course work, research, and a dissertation. The Ph.D. can be completed in four years, and prospective students do not need a master's degree to apply. The master's degree requires 30 credit hours of coursework, research, and a thesis and can be completed in two years. The college also has a dual-degree program that leads to both a DVM and Ph.D. in six years. In this program, students can pursue research opportunities in biomedical and/or clinical studies.

=== Master of Public Health ===
In collaboration with the Virginia Tech Carilion School of Medicine, the veterinary college offers a Master of Public Health professional degree program through the Department of Population Health Sciences. The program is the first of its kind to be accredited at a veterinary college.

=== Residency and Internships ===
The Virginia–Maryland College of Veterinary Medicine provides students with discipline-specific residency programs. All residents must complete a graduate degree (M.S. or Ph.D.). Small-animal clinical residencies and large-animal clinical residencies are designed to provide three to four years of advanced training in specific disciplines in preparation for certification examination by appropriate specialty boards within the veterinary profession. The biomedical sciences and pathobiology residencies, which are part of a combined residency/Ph.D. program, prepare graduates for careers in veterinary clinical pathology or anatomic pathology. The Marion duPont Scott Equine Medical Center offers residency programs in equine internal medicine and surgery. These programs are fully approved by the American College of Veterinary Internal Medicine and the American College of Veterinary Surgery.

Internships at the veterinary college are designed to provide post-DVM students with the opportunity for experience in advanced diagnostic and therapeutic techniques in medicine and surgery as well as seminary and manuscript preparation. Internships are also aimed at providing students with training and experience in clinical instruction and preparing them for residency and graduate study or clinical practice.

== Hospitals ==
Students of the Virginia–Maryland College of Veterinary Medicine can gain veterinary experience by working in one of the college's hospitals: the Veterinary Teaching Hospital, which comprises the Small Animal Hospital and the Harry T. Peters Large Animal Hospital, or the Marion duPont Scott Equine Medical Center.

=== Veterinary Teaching Hospital ===
The Veterinary Teaching Hospital, which comprises the Small Animal Hospital and the Harry T. Peters, Jr. Large Animal Hospital, provides care to clients in the surrounding area. Since the hospital focuses on teaching, residents and interns work closely with clinical faculty members to provide care to small and large animals. Veterinary students in the DVM program participate in three-week clerkships designed to give them hands-on experience; these students welcome patients, record a case history, and conduct the initial examination of the animal prior to consulting with the supervising veterinarian.

=== Marion duPont Scott Equine Medical Center ===
The Marion DuPont Scott Equine Medical Center is a full-service equine hospital located in Leesburg, Virginia. The center, which opened in 1984, has board-certified veterinarians in internal medicine, surgery, and sports medicine as well as veterinarians in residency training programs and licensed veterinary technicians. Since the center's inception, faculty members have helped develop Marquis, the first FDA-approved treatment for equine protozoal myelitis, and GastroGard, a treatment for gastric ulcers.

=== Animal Cancer Care and Research Center ===
Located in Roanoke, Virginia, the Virginia Tech Animal Cancer Care and Research Center is a comprehensive cancer care and clinical research center offering integrated services, including medical, surgical, and radiation oncology, and frontline cancer diagnostics and treatment for dogs and cats.

== Research ==
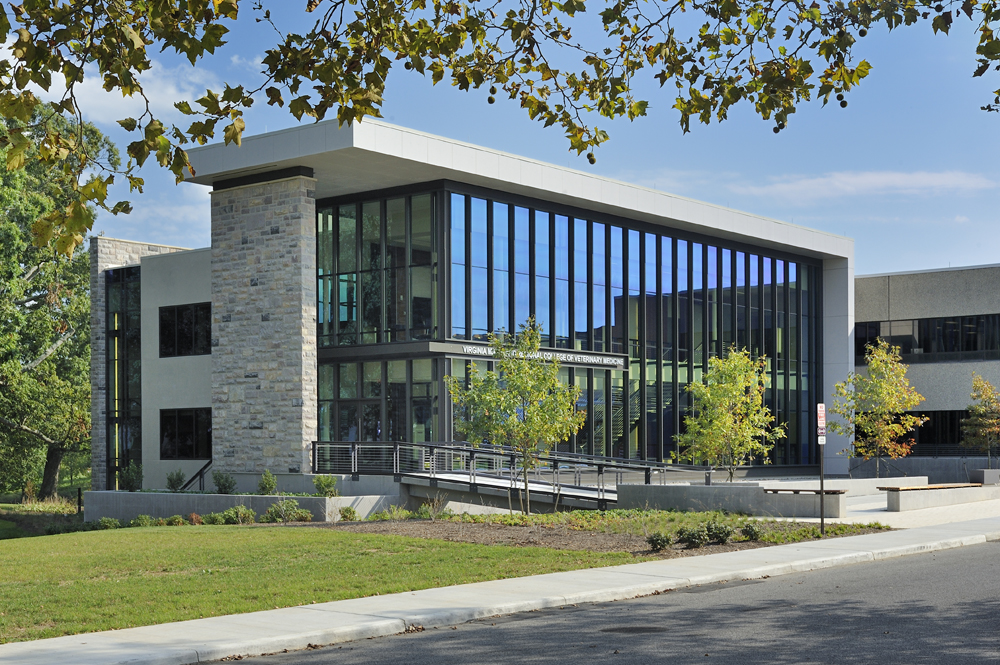
The college opened the Veterinary Medicine Instruction Addition in the fall of 2012. The new building now greets visitors to the college with Hokie Stone.

Students may also gain experience through the college's various research centers, which are spread out across Virginia and Maryland. Under the leadership of the Office of Research and Graduate Studies, the college conducts a broad spectrum of basic/molecular and translational/applied research with a focus on animal health and productivity as well as human health and wellbeing.

Additionally, the school operates a library on its Blacksburg campus that is a part of the Virginia Tech library system.

=== Center for Public Veterinary Medicine ===
The Center for Public and Corporate Veterinary Medicine (CPVM) primarily supervises the public and corporate track of the DVM program. It also coordinates internship opportunities and provides summer fellowships for veterinary students from the United States and several other countries. In 2014, the center's headquarters moved from College Park, Maryland, to Blacksburg, Virginia.

=== Center for Molecular Medicine and Infectious Diseases ===
The central theme of the Center for Molecular Medicine and Infectious Diseases (CMMID) is "Animal Model of Diseases." The faculty specializes in using various animal models that include not only traditional laboratory animal models (mice and rats), but also non-traditional (chickens, pigs, dogs, fish, crab, equine) animal models. CMMID employs animal models to better understand the disease processes that impact both humans and domesticated species. The center is geared toward addressing current problems in public health that require the use of appropriate animal and tissue culture models, as well as gene-expression analysis.

=== Center for Animal Human Relationships ===
The Center for Animal Human Relationships (CENTAUR) is an academic center conducted instructional, research, and outreach programs designed to foster a greater understanding of the mutual benefits associated with human-animal interaction. It provided education, research, and service related to the therapeutic benefits of companion animals. In 2015, the center began a partnership with Saint Francis Service Dogs, a Roanoke-based nonprofit, to raise puppies for future service dog training and teach veterinary students about the human-animal bond. CENTAUR paused activity in 2026.

=== Center for Reproductive Excellence Using Advanced Technology and Endocrinology ===
The Center for Reproductive Excellence using Advanced Technology and Endocrinology (CREATE) has three board-certified theriogenologists, each with their own research and species interests. The CREATE Lab offers advanced reproductive services—from breeding soundness and infertility evaluations to genetic counseling—for the following species: equine, bovine, canine, feline, ovine, and caprine.

=== Laboratory for Neurotoxicity Studies ===
The Virginia Tech Laboratory for Neurotoxicity Studies conducts investigations studying the effects of toxins on the nervous system. Currently, the laboratory is conducting interdisciplinary research in experimental neurotoxicology studying the effects of agents such as pesticides, solvents, heavy metals, mycotoxins, and nanomaterials in in-vitro and in-vivo models, funded by federal agencies and industries. Faculty with expertise in toxicology, pharmacology, neuropathology, and veterinary pathology conduct this work.

=== Veterinary Medical Informatics Laboratory ===
The Veterinary Medical Informatics Laboratory (VMIL) is an interdisciplinary research and service program within the Office of Research and Graduate Studies. VMIL studies conceptual and structural features of the medical information unique to animals. VMIL also assists in analysis and development of medical information models, databases, and systems. In addition to its research, VMIL acts as a service program by developing terminologies for veterinary organizations.

== See also ==
- University of Maryland College of Agriculture and Natural Resources
