= Clarence Mitchell III =

American politician

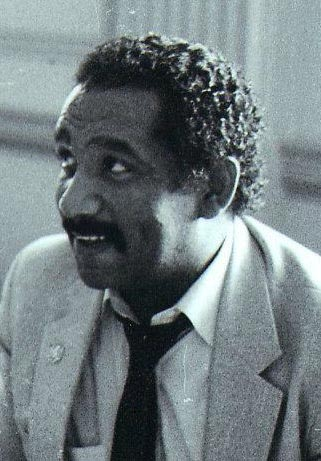

Member of the Maryland Senate from the 39th district
- In office 1967–1986
- Succeeded by: Michael B. Mitchell

Maryland House of Delegates
- In office 1963–1967

Personal details
- Born: Clarence Maurice Mitchell III; December 14, 1939 St. Paul, Minnesota, U.S.
- Died: October 11, 2012 (aged 72) Baltimore, Maryland
- Party: Democratic
- Spouse: Joyce Ellis
- Children: 7, including Clarence IV
- Parents: Clarence Mitchell Jr. (father); Juanita Jackson (mother)
- Relatives: Lillie Mae Carroll Jackson (grandmother); Parren Mitchell (uncle); Keiffer Mitchell Jr. (nephew)

Clarence Maurice Mitchell III (December 14, 1939 – October 11, 2012) was an American politician from Baltimore, Maryland who served in the Maryland Senate and the Maryland House of Delegates.

== Background ==
Mitchell was born in St. Paul, Minnesota, December 14, 1939. The son of Clarence M. Mitchell Jr. and Juanita Jackson Mitchell, he attended Baltimore City public schools and then Gonzaga High School in Washington, D.C. After high school, Mitchell attended the University of Maryland and Morgan State University. He was a member of Kappa Alpha Psi fraternity.

== Career ==
Mitchell first served in the Maryland House of Delegates, Legislative District 4 (Baltimore City) from 1963 to 1967; he was elected at 22 and sworn in at 23 years old.

After 4 years in the House, he ran for the Maryland Senate and won. During the next 20 years he represented Senate, Legislative Districts 10, 38 & 39, all in Baltimore City. 1967-86. During that time he was the Deputy majority leader, 1975–78, Majority whip, 1979, member of the Judicial Proceedings Committee, Co-chair of the Joint Committee on Federal Relations and Chairman of the Executive Nominations Committee.

On the national level, Mitchell was also elected to serve as President of the National Black Caucus of State Legislators, from 1979 to 1985.

== Legal issues ==
In 1983 he was charged with carrying a weapon onto an airplane.

A year after leaving the Senate in 1986, Mitchell was convicted of attempting to obstruct a grand jury, committing wire fraud and attempting to tamper with a federal investigation in the Wedtech scandal. He was sentenced to 54 months in prison, but was released after serving 18 months.

== Personal life ==
Mitchell was married to Joyce Ellis. Their seven children include Clarence Mitchell IV, Stepson to Joyce, who served in the Maryland House of Delegates and the Maryland State Senate, and also hosted The C4 Show on WBAL radio.

Mitchell died October 11, 2012, in Randallstown, Maryland.
