= Subaqueous soil =

Example of a subaqueous soil landscape map of Ninigret Pond, Charlestown, Rhode Island, US

Subaqueous soils are soils formed in sediment found in shallow, permanently flooded environments or soils in any areas permanently covered by water too deep for the growth of rooted plants.

The study of subaqueous soils is a relatively new field in Pedology or soil science. The concept that sediments in shallow water environments undergo soil-forming processes, are capable of supporting rooted plants (such as Eelgrass), and meet the definition of soil according to criteria in Soil Taxonomy has been moving soil scientists into a new frontier of soil survey – mapping subaqueous soils.

The National Cooperative Soil Survey (NCSS) is a nationwide partnership of Federal, regional, State, and local agencies and institutions. This partnership works together to cooperatively investigate, inventory, document, classify, and interpret soils and to disseminate, publish, and promote the use of information about the soils of the United States and its trust territories. The activities of the NCSS are carried out on National, regional, and State levels.

The USDA-Natural Resources Conservation Service (NRCS) is the lead federal agency for mapping and developing interpretations for the nation's soil resources and the extension of soil survey technology to global applications.

== Subaqueous and Submerged Soils ==
As the name implies, subaqueous and submerged soils are soils that occur under water (both fresh and salt water). The depth range of the water column where these soils may be found is not known, an arbitrary depth of 2.5 meters below the surface has been set for soil survey inventory but some states have extended this depth to 5 m (NAVD 88). The difference between subaqueous and submerged soils is that submerged soils formed in an upland environment then became submerged as a result of rising water tables, flooding events (such as a Beaver Dam), or sea level rise. Subaqueous soils formed under a continuous water column (such as in an estuary), although their sediments may have originated from an upland area such as a dune.

Although proposals to include permanently submersed sediments as soil have been put forth since the mid-1800s, it was not until the early 1990s that the concept of subaqueous soils was developed in the U.S. The pioneer in U.S. subaqueous soils is the late George Demas, a soil scientist working for the National Cooperative Soil Survey in the Chesapeake Bay region of Maryland. Dr. Demas observed that subaqueous areas met the definition of soil by being able to support rooted plant growth (such as Eelgrass) and had formed soil horizons. Further study revealed that these submersed sediments underwent other soil forming (pedogenic) processes including additions, losses, and transformations of energy and matter.

== Significance ==
A major limitation to science-based management of shallow water habitats has been a lack of definitive information on the properties and spatial distribution of subaqueous soils. In part, this lack of information has stemmed from an inadequate paradigm for subaqueous soils, which has not considered them "soils" at all, but rather as "sediments". During the last decade, it has been demonstrated that these "sediments" would be better understood as "soils" and that the sedimentary paradigm should give way to a pedological paradigm.

An advantage of using the pedological approach to study shallow water habitat is that soils are studied as a collection of horizons that are linked vertically with depth and horizontally across the subaqueous landscape. These horizons are studied and characterized by examining a combination of properties and characteristics, instead of, say, a single component or parameter. In this manner, subaqueous soil can be characterized as ecological map units and provide a site-based system to identify the geomorphic settings that represent the subaqueous landscape. The following are some advantages of using an emphasis on subaqueous soils in shallow water classification:

1. Sediment characteristics presented to a greater depth (2 m), rather than a bottom-type classification (such as mud bottom or rocky bottom).
2. Provides a comprehensive classification scheme (Soil Taxonomy, Soil Survey Manual) for shallow water sediments.
3. Could provide a major or missing dataset for submersed aquatic vegetation (SAV) restoration, estuarine protection, planning and management.

=== Subaqueous soil survey ===
Several states throughout the U.S. have begun the process of mapping and inventorying subaqueous soils. Within NRCS, each state is responsible for determining the priority given to subaqueous soil mapping, based on their importance in local conservation concerns.

=== Nitrogen dynamics in submerged soil ===
The soil condition with submergence of water (continuous or intermittent) is submerged soil. Such soil occurs in rice fields, wetlands, estuaries and flood plains. Nitrogen dynamics is different as that from aerated soil conditions affecting soil microorganisms and nitrogen cycle.

== Mapping ==
Traditional terrestrial soil mapping is conducted by a soil scientist trained to understand the interaction of soil-forming processes and soil-landscape relations. Mapping soils involves field work traversing the landscape and digging many holes to observe and classify the soil in various locations. Subaqueous soil mapping is performed in much the same way, except the mapper is in water. Instead of topographic maps and aerial photographs, subaqueous soil mapping uses bathymetric maps to identify underwater landscapes and landforms (a glossary of subaqueous landforms is available at: Glossary of Subaqueous Soil Landscape Terms). Shovels are replaced by augers with extendable shafts, and special tools such as peat corers and the vibracore to obtain soil samples.

=== Uses ===
A major use of traditional soil surveys is to provide interpretations for various land uses and environmental planning. Interpretations for subaqueous soils are currently being developed for a variety of uses. As more areas are surveyed and more data collected, a wide array of soil interpretations are expected.
