= Clarence Mitchell IV =

American radio host and former politician

Member of the Maryland Senate from the 44th district
- In office January 1999 – January 2003
- Preceded by: John D. Jefferies
- Succeeded by: Verna L. Jones

Member of the Maryland House of Delegates from the 44th district
- In office January 1995 – January 1999

Personal details
- Born: Clarence Maurice Mitchell IV; May 16, 1962 (age 64) Baltimore, Maryland, US
- Party: Democratic
- Relations: Lillie Mae Carroll Jackson (great-grandmother); Clarence Mitchell Jr. (grandfather); Parren Mitchell (uncle); Keiffer Mitchell Jr. (cousin)
- Parents: Clarence Mitchell III (father); Clarice E. Wheatley (mother)

Clarence Maurice Mitchell IV (born May 16, 1962) is an American radio host and politician who currently cohosts The C4 And Bryan Nehman Show on Baltimore radio station WBAL. Mitchell served in the Maryland House of Delegates from 1995 to 1999 and Maryland Senate from 1999 to 2003 as a member of the Democratic Party.

== Early life ==
Mitchell was born into Maryland's Mitchell political family, the son of Clarence Mitchell III and grandson of Clarence Mitchell, Jr. Mitchell was educated at Baltimore Polytechnic Institute, University of Maryland, College Park, University of Maryland, Baltimore County, and Morgan State University. In 1984, Mitchell was on the advance staff of Walter Mondale's presidential campaign.

In 1990, Mitchell got a license to work as a bail bondsman, which he renewed in June 1997. He reportedly oversaw several family bond and insurance companies. His connections to the bail-bond business led to criticisms of conflict of interest in 1999 during his Senate term, at which time he said he did no work outside of his elected office.

== Political career ==
Mitchell was a State Senator from Maryland's 44th legislative district from January 1999 to January 2003, and prior to that he was a State Delegate of the same district from January 1995 to January 1999. Mitchell held the same Senate seat once held by his father Clarence M. Mitchell III, and uncle Michael B. Mitchell.

Defeated for reelection to the Senate in the 2002 Democratic primary, Mitchell described his loss as party establishment punishment for his successful opposition to Gov. Parris Glendening's redistricting plan that ended with the Maryland Court of Appeals finding the map unconstitutional; however, reporting also mentioned Mitchell's support for successful Republican gubernatorial candidate Bob Ehrlich and an ethics reprimand from the General Assembly. Mitchell said he would leave the Democratic Party in December 2001 because the governor's legislative redistricting map, by merging the 47th district into his 44th, hurt minority representation. Mitchell was publicly reprimanded in February 2002 for accepting a $10,000 loan as a State Delegate in 1997 from businessmen (including two city bail bondsmen) with issues before the legislature, a loan on which no payments had been made five years later. Mitchell received a letter from the State Ethics Commission of Maryland stating that he did not violate any ethics rules. Mitchell also received a letter, very rarely issued, by the State Prosecutor Stephen Montanarelli stating that he did not violate any state laws. Mitchell was also fined $350 in 2001 for failing to submit required annual financial disclosure forms in a timely manner.

Mitchell endorsed Republican Bob Ehrlich for governor in May 2002. After Ehrlich won the general election, Mitchell was hired as the director of the newly created Office of Urban Development in the Department of Housing and Community Development. Two weeks later Mitchell was forced to resign just before the nominee for secretary of that department faced a Senate confirmation hearing.

== Radio career ==
In 1995, Mitchell participated in a radio show, "The Mitchells' Maryland Magazine", hosted by his father Clarence M. Mitchell III and his sister Lisa Mitchell on WOLB-AM. Starting in 2007, Mitchell hosted The C4 Show, a talk show on WBAL (AM) in Baltimore. On January 2, 2012, following the death of fellow radio host Ron Smith, Mitchell's program was expanded to four hours, running 10 AM to 2 PM, Monday-Friday, while dropping Saturdays. At some point the show was shortened, as on July 8, 2013, it was reported that it would be expanded from two hours to three hours, 9 AM to noon. In July 2020, Mitchell was paired with Bryan Nehman, morning news host for the previous eight years, as Mornings With C4 And Bryan Nehman, weekdays from 5:30-10 AM.

== Election results ==
=== 1994 ===
1994 House of Delegates Primary Election Results, District 44
Candidate	Votes	Party	Percentage
Ruby Boulware	569	Democratic	3%
Vickie Cumberland	464	Democratic	2%
Elijah Cummings	4,464	Democratic	23% (Winner)
John E. Hannay	1,190	Democratic	6%
John D. Jefferies	2,984	Democratic	16%
Verna L. Jones	2,216	Democratic	12%
Ruth M. Kirk	3,072	Democratic	16% (Winner)
Clarence M. Mitchell IV	3,212	Democratic	17% (Winner)
Daymon Royster	422	Democratic	2%
Michael Anthony Williams	562	Democratic	3%

1994 House of Delegates General Election Results, District 44
Candidate	Votes	Party	Percentage
Elijah Cummings	9,823	Democratic	34% (Winner)
Ruth M. Kirk	9,358	Democratic	32% (Winner)
Clarence M. Mitchell IV	9,838	Democratic	34% (Winner)

=== 1998 ===
1998 State Senate Primary Election Results, District 44
Candidate	Votes	Party	Percentage
John D. Jefferies	2,796	Democratic	47%
Clarence M. Mitchell IV	3,101	Democratic	53% (Winner)

1998 State Senate General Election Results, District 44
Candidate	Votes	Party	Percentage
Clarence M. Mitchell IV	11,304	Democratic	100% (Winner)

=== 2002 ===
2002 State Senate Primary Election Results, District 44
Candidate	Votes	Party	Percentage
Verna L. Jones	7,384	Democratic	68.5% (Winner)
Clarence M. Mitchell IV	3,389	Democratic	31.5%
