= Clarence Mitchell (bishop) =

Suffragan Bishop of the Diocese of Niagara

Clarence Malcolm Mitchell was suffragan bishop of the Diocese of Niagara from 1980 until 1990.

Mitchell was educated at the University of Western Ontario and ordained in 1954. After a curacy at Welland he held incumbencies at Port Dalhousie, Burlington, Hamilton and Guelph. He was archdeacon of Trafalgar from 1970 to 1974 and then of Wellington until his elevation to the episcopate
