= George Demas =

American pedologist

George P. Demas
- Born: April 28, 1958
- Died: December 23, 1999 (aged 41); Snow Hill, Maryland
- Education: University of Maryland
- Known for: Subaqueous Soils in the USA
- Scientific career
- Fields: Pedology (soil study)
- Workplaces: USDA Natural Resources Conservation Service

George Demas (April 28, 1958 – December 23, 1999) was an American pedologist whose pioneering studies of subaqueous soil contributed to the understanding of soil formation and the expansion of the concept of soil. USDA soil taxonomy was revised as a result.

Born in the U.S., he earned a B.S. in Soil Science from the University of Maryland, College Park in 1980 followed by an M.S. in soil genesis in 1982. He earned a Ph.D. from the University of Maryland in 1998. His thesis “Subaqueous soils of Sinepatuxent Bay, MD” earned two awards USDA - Secretary's Honor Award for Scientific Research, and Soil Science Society of America (SSSA) - The Emil Truog Award for outstanding contribution to Soil Science.

George Demas worked as a soil surveyor for the Natural Resources Conservation Service in the states of Maryland and New Jersey from 1982 to 1994. During this time he determined that submerged sediments function in the landscape sufficiently similar to soils to be indistinguishable. Soil Survey Horizons published his concept in 1993. He returned to the University of Maryland and researched his ideas from 1994 to 1998. He resumed his duties with USDA-NRCS and continued working until his death in 1999 after contracting pneumonia. The subaqueous soils field continues to grow with expanded graduate studies in Rhode Island and Maine as well as at the University of Maryland.

== Published works ==
- Demas, G. P. 1993. Submerged soils: a new frontier in soil survey. Soil Survey Horizons 34: 44–46.
- Demas, G. P., M. C. Rabenhorst, and J. C. Stevenson. 1996. Subaqueous Soils: A pedological approach to the study of shallow water habitats. Estuaries 19: 229–237.
- Demas, G. P., and M. C. Rabenhorst. 1998. Subaqueous soils: a resource inventory protocol. Proceedings of the 16th World Congress on Soil Science, Montpellier, France. August 20–26, 1998. Sym #17, on CD.
- Demas, G. P., and M. C. Rabenhorst. 1999. Subaqueous soils: pedogenesis in a submersed environment. Soil Sci. Soc. Am J. 63: 1250–1257.
- Demas, G. P., and M. C. Rabenhorst. 2001. Factors of Subaqueous Soil Formation: a System of Quantitative Pedology for Submersed Environments. Geoderma. 102:189-204
