= Clarence Mitchell Jr. =

American civil rights activist (1911–1984)

Clarence M. Mitchell Jr.
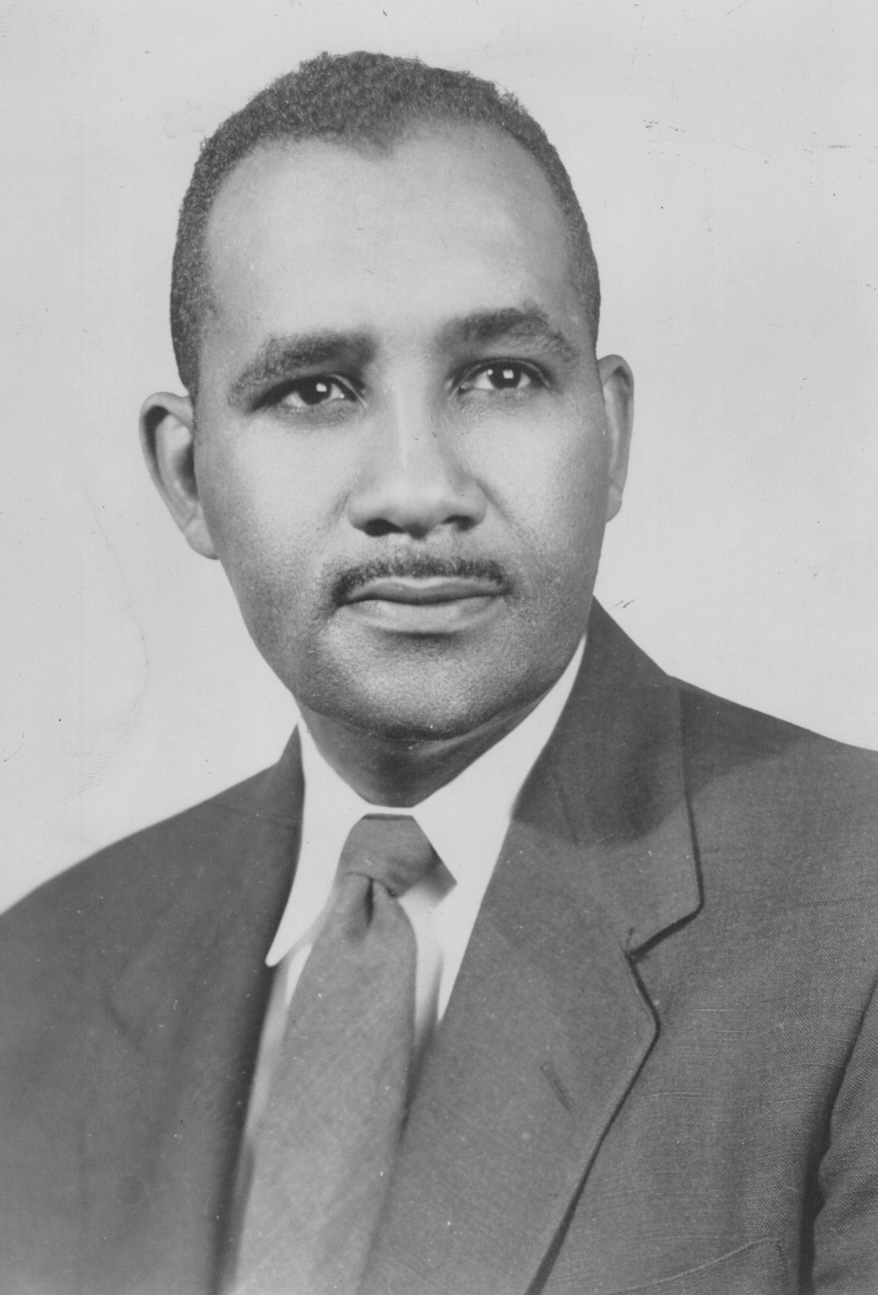
- Clarence Mitchell in 1962
- Born: Clarence Maurice Mitchell Jr. March 8, 1911; Baltimore, Maryland
- Died: March 18, 1984 (aged 73); Baltimore, Maryland
- Other name: The 101st senator
- Education: Lincoln University; University of Minnesota; University of Maryland Francis King Carey School of Law
- Occupation: Civil rights activist
- Spouse: Juanita Jackson
- Children: 4, including Clarence III
- Relatives: Lillie May Carroll Jackson (mother-in-law); Parren Mitchell (brother); Clarence Mitchell IV (grandson); Keiffer Mitchell Jr. (grandson)

Clarence Maurice Mitchell Jr. (March 8, 1911 – March 18, 1984) was an American civil rights activist and was the chief lobbyist for the NAACP for nearly 30 years. He also served as a regional director for the organization.

Mitchell, nicknamed "the 101st U.S. Senator", waged a tireless campaign on Capitol Hill, helping to secure passage of civil rights legislation in the 1950s and 1960s: the Civil Rights Act of 1957, the Civil Rights Act of 1960, the Civil Rights Act of 1964, the Voting Rights Act of 1965 and the Fair Housing Act (Title VIII of the Civil Rights Act of 1968).

In 1969, he was awarded the Spingarn Medal by the NAACP for these efforts. On June 9, 1980, he was presented with the "Presidential Medal of Freedom" by 39th President Jimmy Carter.

After his retirement, Mitchell wrote a Sunday editorial column for The Baltimore Sun every Sunday until his death in 1984. The Sun called it "an extraordinary commentary on the civil rights movement." On March 23, 1984, the Sharp Street Memorial United Methodist Church overflowed with 2,500 mourners who gathered from around the country to pay their respects. Included among them was Harry Hughes (Governor of Maryland), William Donald Schaefer (Mayor of Baltimore and later Governor), Benjamin Hooks, director of the NAACP; and Dorothy Height, president of the National Council of Negro Women.

The main city courthouse in Baltimore City was renamed as the Clarence M. Mitchell Jr. Courthouse in 1985 in his honor. Other facilities were also named for him.

== Early life and education ==
Mitchell was born in Baltimore, Maryland, to Clarence M. Mitchell, a waiter, and Elsie (Davis) Mitchell, a homemaker. Mitchell's brother, Parren Mitchell, became a U.S. Congressman representing Maryland's 7th congressional district.

Clarence Mitchell was raised in a large household consisting of 11 family members (him, along with his parents, his maternal grandparents, and six siblings.) One sibling died prior to Clarence's birth, and two died when he was young. According to the U.S. Census records in 1910; His maternal grandparents lived with the family until their deaths in 1912 and 1913. The family moved frequently when Mitchell was young, living in rented homes in the same area of Baltimore City. In 1929 his parents purchased their own home at 712 Carrollton Avenue in Baltimore's Harlem Park neighborhood. Mitchell saw their hardships; his mother took in meal boarders to supplement his father's income from working at the historic Rennert Hotel on the northeastern corner of West Saratoga and North Liberty Streets.

Mitchell's mother and the children attended church at St. Katherine's Episcopal Church, where Mitchell and his brother Parren served in the services on Sunday mornings. The family celebrated Christmas, his mother decorating the home. His parents kept things in good condition, with an orderly yard. Mitchell was taught by his parents not to "take anything from anyone" when it came to racial issues; the older children taught the younger children, too. Clarence spent time at the YMCA (Colored – Young Men's Christian Association) learning how to box, and earned the nickname "the Shamrock Kid."

Mitchell excelled in his early childhood education and worked hard to learn lessons taught to him by his illiterate mother. When Mitchell was in elementary school, one of his teachers was the mother of Thurgood Marshall, future attorney and United States Supreme Court Justice. Mitchell worked many odd jobs throughout his childhood; from hauling ice and coal in a wagon for money, which he subsequently gave to his parents to support the household; to working with Thurgood Marshall and his father as a busboy at the Gibson Island Club.

=== Education ===
Mitchell attended Old Douglass High School, and after graduating, he enrolled at Lincoln University, a historically black college in Pennsylvania. He excelled at his studies. He wrote the song for his graduating class at Lincoln, but was not able to join his fellows on stage, as he was unable to pay overdue tuition.

Mitchell also attended the University of Minnesota, receiving a post-graduate degree in social work after which he became the executive secretary for the National Urban League in St. Paul in 1937. While in Minnesota, he led a successful campaign to end employment discrimination practices against African Americans who worked for the city. Later, he received a Juris Doctor from the University of Maryland Francis King Carey School of Law.

== Career ==
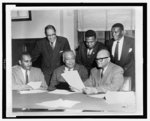
Mitchell (seated, bottom left), with William Holmes Borders (seated, bottom center), and A. T. Walden (seated, bottom right), with 3 unknown standing men, 1950.

As a young man, Mitchell worked for the Baltimore Afro-American newspaper. He wrote articles about the infamous Scottsboro case in 1931. He also covered the lynching of Matthew Williams on December 4, 1931, in Salisbury on the Eastern Shore of Maryland. The young black man was accused of killing his white employer. Mitchell had not seen the lynching but arrived as the white mob set Williams' body on fire and dragged it through the black neighborhood of the city. White journalist H.L. Mencken also covered these events for The Baltimore Sun, attacking newspapers on the Eastern Shore for contributing to a racist atmosphere and being too cowardly to cover the lynching. After Mitchell returned home and recounted the events, his brother Parren vowed to one day take up the fight for racial justice.

In the 1940s, Mitchell began working as staff to the Fair Employment Practices Committee, established by President Franklin D. Roosevelt by Executive Order 8802 in 1941, to oversee ending discrimination in defense industries with contracts with the federal government, and provide fair employment opportunities to all Americans. From 1942 to 1946, he acted as "principal fair practice examiner, associate director of field operations, and director of field operations" in the Washington, D.C., area.

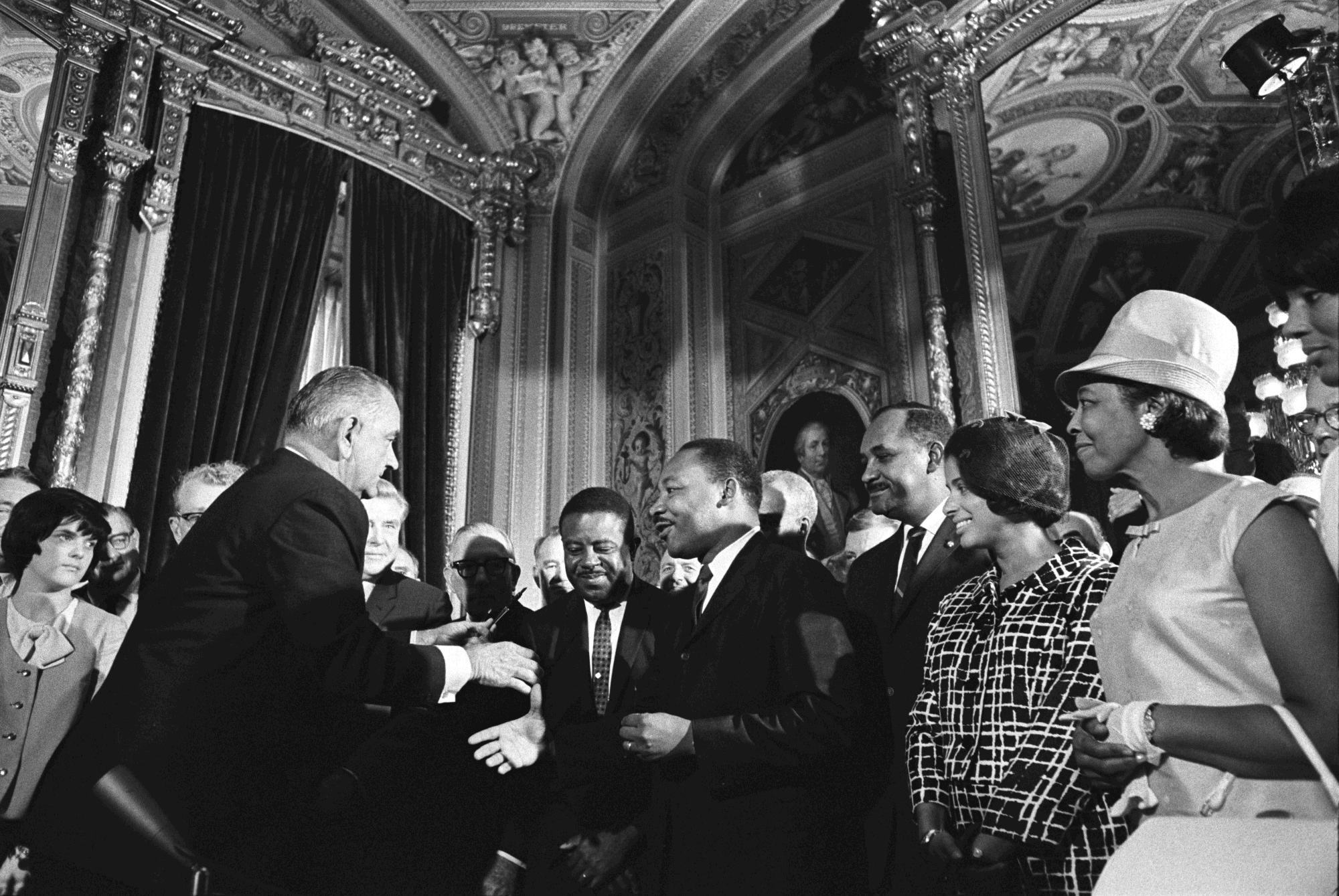
President Lyndon Johnson with Mitchell, Martin Luther King Jr. (in center of group), and other civil rights leaders at the signing of the landmark Voting Rights Act in 1965.

Based on that experience, after the end of the war Mitchell began working for the NAACP in 1946, as NAACP Labor Secretary and Director of the NAACP Washington Bureau, serving from 1946 to 1950. In 1951 he was promoted to Director of the NAACP Washington Bureau, serving 1951–1954.

In 1952 Walter White, president of the NAACP, set up the Leadership Conference on Civil Rights, a coalition of civil rights, civic, labor, religious, and fraternal organizations to manage political operations in Washington for civil rights. Roy Wilkins, NAACP executive director, served as chairman of the LCCR, and Mitchell was appointed as legislative chairman. "He directed the strategy that resulted in the fulfillment of the goals of the modern civil rights movement." The Civil Rights Act of 1957 was a step toward securing the constitutional rights of all citizens. Of note was the fact that during the passing of the act, segregationist senator Strom Thurmond took it upon himself to stage an obstructively long speech known as a "filibuster" to prevent it from passing. This was despite previously agreeing not to do so. Thurmond's filibuster, lasting 24 hours and 18 minutes, was the longest ever given in the US Senate by a single person. Mitchell was present in the Senate chamber gallery during the speech along with several hundred other people when it started at 8:54 p.m.EST and had the stamina to stay there during the early morning while the filibuster was still ongoing. By which time, almost everyone in the gallery had left except for Mitchell himself and Thurmond's wife Jean.

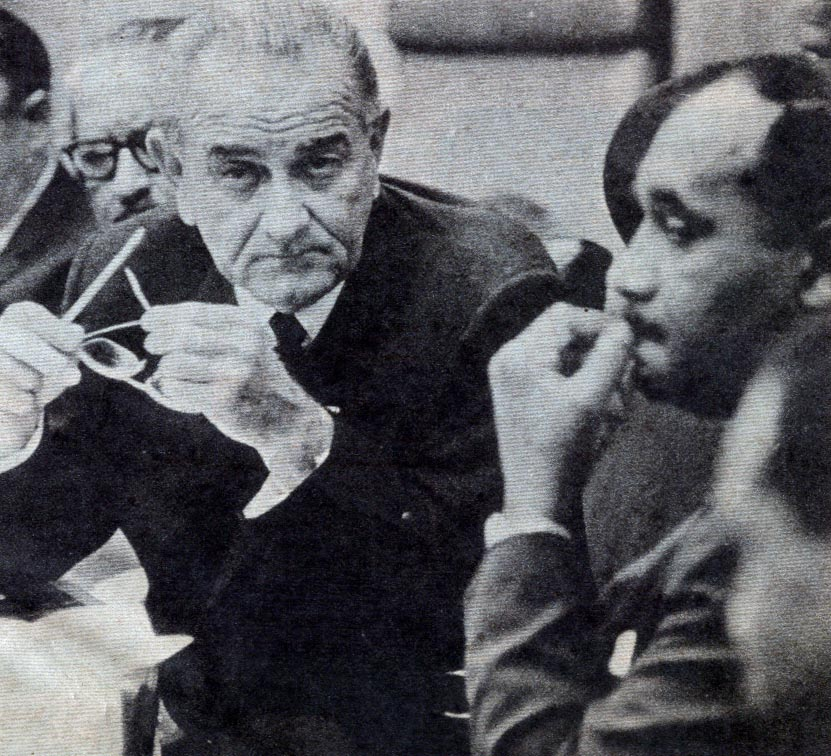
President Lyndon Johnson meets with Mitchell and other black leaders after the death of Martin Luther King Jr. in 1968.

Mitchell continued to serve as an NAACP lobbyist to Congress through the 1960s, as the civil rights movement reached new peaks in demonstrations and increasing national awareness through campaigns in the South. Mitchell helped secure passage of the era's critical civil rights legislation: the Civil Rights Act of 1960, the Civil Rights Act of 1964, the Voting Rights Act of 1965 and the Fair Housing Act (Title VIII of the Civil Rights Act of 1968). He was nicknamed "the 101st U.S. Senator."

Mitchell was criticized by some in the black community for his defense of Daniel Patrick Moynihan in the controversy over the latter's "benign neglect" theory of race relations. In addition, Mitchell defended the State of Israel during its war of 1967 against Arab states and was criticized by some for this. Mitchell was among the African-American leaders with whom President Johnson met after Rev. Martin Luther King Jr., was assassinated in April 1968.

Mitchell retired from the NAACP in 1978, but continued to consult for the organization, and practiced law in Baltimore.

Mitchell was a member on the Board of Regents at the University of Maryland, College Park from 1982 to 1984. His papers and those of the NAACP Washington Bureau 1942–1978, are held at the State University of New York (SUNY) College at Old Westbury, New York.

== Personal life ==
In 1938, Mitchell married Juanita Jackson, a civil rights activist with the NAACP and the first black woman to practice law in Maryland. She was the daughter of Dr. Lillie Jackson, who was also a major civil rights leader with the NAACP. The Mitchells had four sons, Keiffer J. Mitchell, George D. Mitchell, Michael B. Mitchell and Clarence M. Mitchell III. Their grandson Clarence M. Mitchell IV was a member of the Maryland House of Delegates and the Maryland State Senate. Another grandson, Keiffer J. Mitchell, Jr., was a member of the Baltimore City Council and ran for Mayor of Baltimore in 2007.

1959 was a year of serious losses for Mitchell: his father died of cancer in June and his brother Lorenzo in a car accident. Although confined to bed at the time of Lorenzo's death, his mother Elsie Davis Mitchell had her other sons carry her into the church for his funeral service, so that she did not have to use a wheelchair. Mitchell's mother died in November 1959; his column on the occasion, "A Star is a Small Reward," was published in the Afro-American.

Mitchell died March 18, 1984, of a heart attack, at 73 years old. He died at Maryland General Hospital in Baltimore.

== Legacy and honors ==
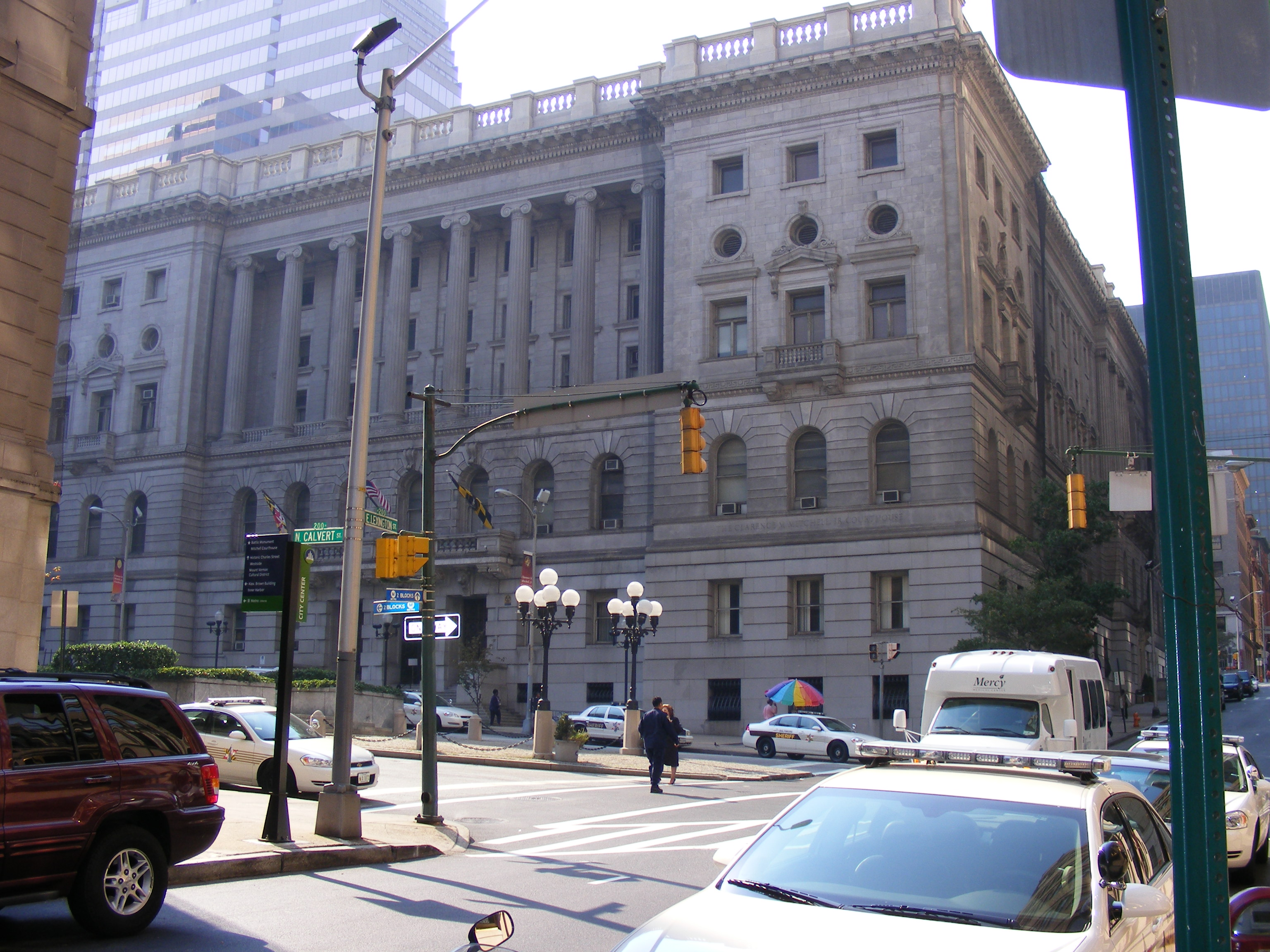
Clarence M. Mitchell Jr. – Baltimore City Circuit Courthouse (constructed 1896–1900), Baltimore Maryland

- In 1969 Mitchell was awarded the Spingarn Medal of the NAACP.
- President Jimmy Carter presented Mitchell with the Presidential Medal of Freedom on June 9, 1980. This is the highest civilian honor in the United States.
- In 1985 the Baltimore City Circuit Courthouse and the States' Attorney's Office for Baltimore City (constructed 1896–1900, one of the city's monuments) was named in his honor. An exhibit on Mitchell is installed in the west side lobby facing the St. Paul Street entrance.
- The Clarence Mitchell Jr. Building, located on the University of Maryland, College Park campus (the Office of Undergraduate Admissions, originally called North Administration or Administration Annex), was named in his honor in a dedication ceremony on May 17, 1988. Also at the College Park, Maryland campus, the Art/Sociology Building was renamed in his brother's honor as the Parren J. Mitchell Art-Sociology Building on December 3, 2015.
- The Clarence M. Mitchell Jr. Building, a 35,000-square-foot (3,300 m^{2}) facility that houses the engineering program at Morgan State University in Baltimore, was named for him.
- Denton L. Watson wrote a biography of Mitchell: Lion in the Lobby : Clarence Mitchell, Jr.'s Struggle for the Passage of Civil Rights Laws (2002).
- Mitchell is included among noted citizens in the book Marylanders of the Century, written by Joseph R. L. Sterne, former editor of The Baltimore Sun, who covered the national civil rights struggle from Washington during the 1960s.
- Denton L. Watson is working on a nine volume historical documentary edition of The Papers of Clarence Mitchell Jr. Five printed volumes have been published by the Ohio Press so far and he will also include a digital edition.

== Primary sources ==
- The Papers of Clarence Mitchell Jr., Volume III: NAACP Labor Secretary and Director of the NAACP Washington Bureau, 1946 – 1950; Volume IV: Director of the NAACP Washington Bureau, 1951 – 1954, edited by Denton L. Watson (Ohio University Press; 2010)
