= Harry J. Patterson =

American college president (1866–1946)

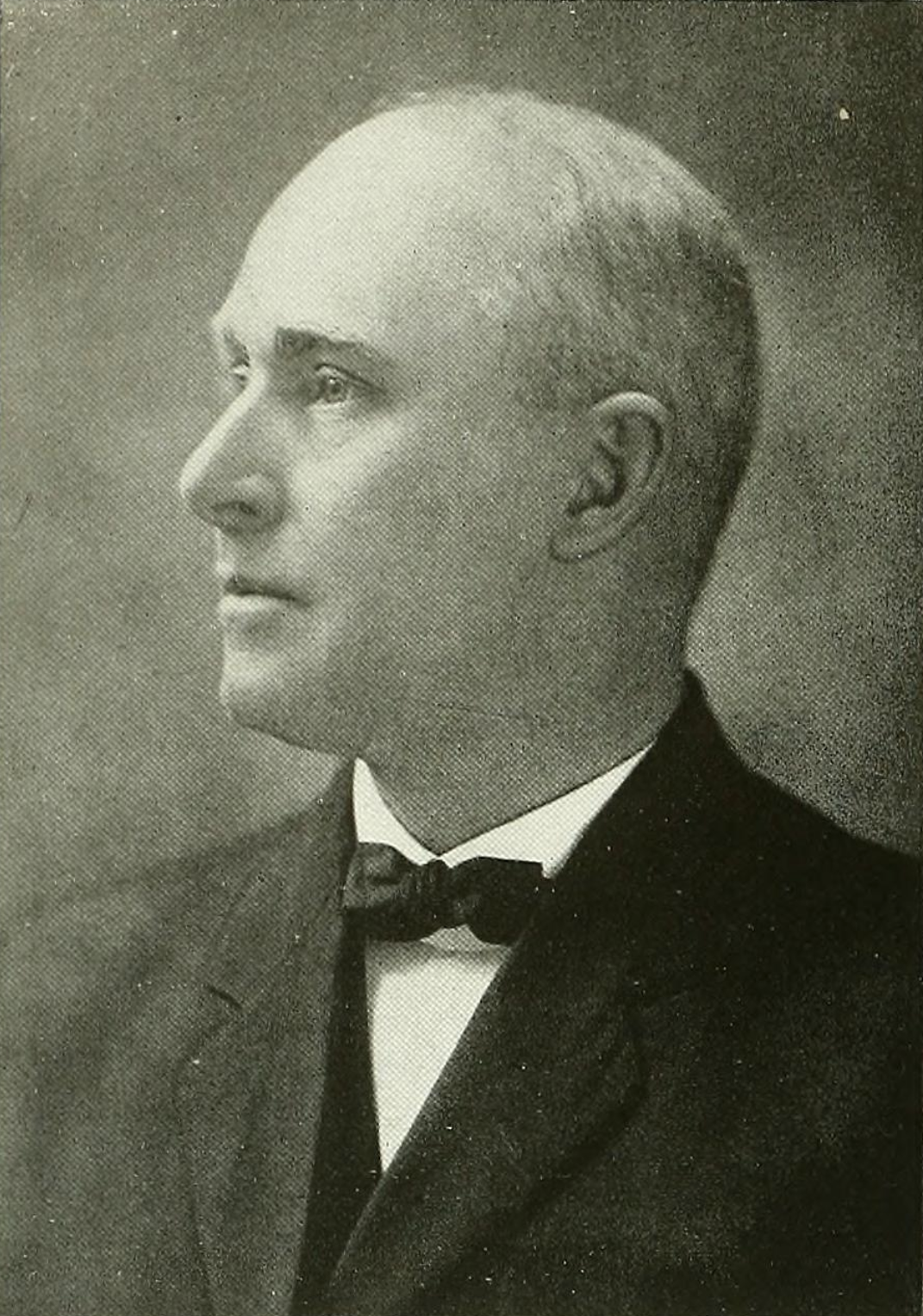
- Patterson in 1920 publication
- Born: Harry Jacob Patterson; December 17, 1866; Yellow Springs, Blair County, Pennsylvania, U.S.
- Died: September 11, 1946 (aged 79); Boston, Massachusetts, U.S.
- Resting place: St. John's Cemetery; Beltsville, Maryland, U.S.
- Education: Pennsylvania State University (BS); Maryland Agricultural College (ScD)
- Occupations: University president; chemist
- Known for: President of Maryland Agricultural College
- Spouse: Elizabeth Hayward Hutchinson (m. 1895)
- Children: 2

Harry Jacob Patterson (December 17, 1866 – September 11, 1946) was president of the Maryland Agricultural College from 1913 to 1917. He later served as dean of the College of Agriculture at the University of Maryland.

== Early life ==
Harry Jacob Patterson was born on December 17, 1866, in Yellow Springs, Blair County, Pennsylvania, to Adaline (née Mattern) and William Calvin Patterson. He attended public schools and the Pennsylvania State College Prep School. He graduated with a Bachelor of Science from Pennsylvania State University in 1886. He did his post graduate work at Pennsylvania State. Patterson graduated from Maryland Agricultural College (later University of Maryland) in 1912 with a Doctor of Science.

== Career ==
Patterson worked as an assistant chemist at Pennsylvania Experiment Station from 1886 to 1888. He worked as chemist at Maryland Experiment Station from 1888 to 1895. He then also served as vice director of the Maryland Experiment Station from 1895 to 1898 and director from 1898 to his retirement in 1937. He served as secretary of the Maryland State Board of Agriculture from 1908 to 1916. He also served as vice president and director of the Hyattsville First National Bank.

Patterson served as president of Maryland Agricultural College from 1913 to 1916 and from 1916 to 1917 after it was renamed the Maryland State College of Agriculture. He resigned to work at the Agricultural Experiment Station. During his tenure, the first women were admitted to the college and he established three years of high school education as a prerequisite to admission. He also served as the dean of the College of Agriculture after the school became the University of Maryland.

He served as Brevet 1st Lieutenant of the National Guard of Pennsylvania.

Patterson was president of the American Association for the Advancement of Science. He was also a member of the American Chemical Society, Society of Chemical Industry of London and the Society for the Promotion of Agricultural Sciences.

== Personal life ==
Patterson married Elizabeth Hayward Hutchinson in 1895. They had two children, Blanche and William Calvin.

Patterson built a Colonial Revival–style home at 7403 Dartmouth Avenue in College Park around 1918.

Patterson died on September 11, 1948, in a railroad station in Boston. He was buried at St. John's Cemetery in Beltsville, Maryland.

== Legacy ==
The H. J. Patterson Building at University of Maryland is named after him.
