= Parren Mitchell =

American politician (1922–2007)

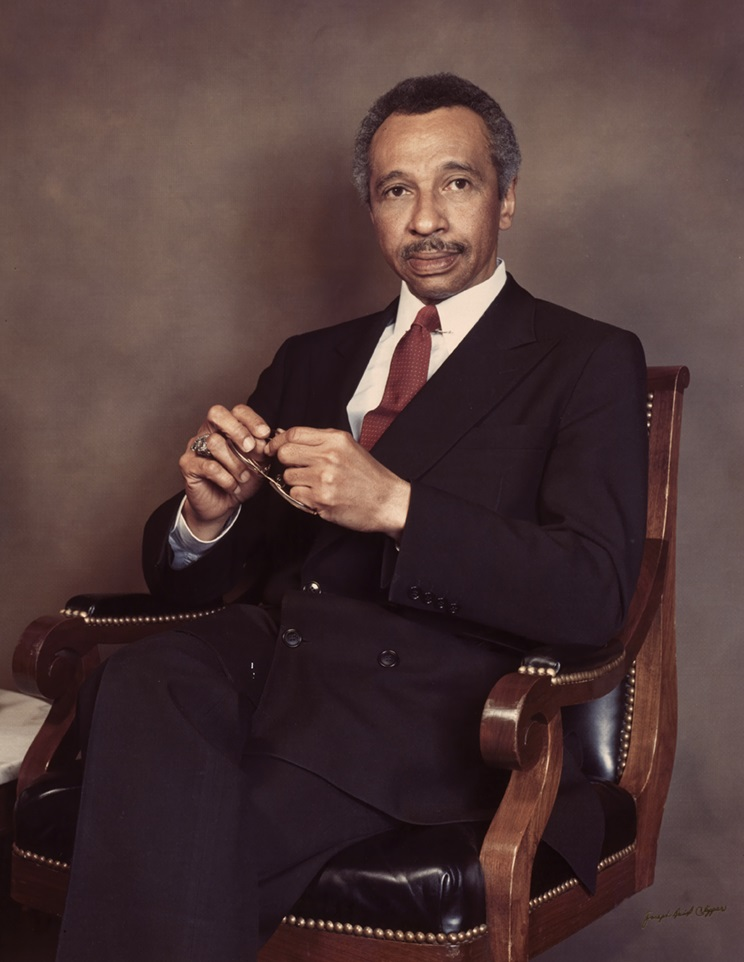

Chair of the House Small Business Committee
- In office January 3, 1981 – January 3, 1987
- Preceded by: Neal Smith
- Succeeded by: John LaFalce

Member of the U.S. House of Representatives from Maryland's 7th district
- In office January 3, 1971 – January 3, 1987
- Preceded by: Samuel Friedel
- Succeeded by: Kweisi Mfume

Personal details
- Born: Parren James Mitchell; April 29, 1922 Baltimore, Maryland, U.S.
- Died: May 28, 2007 (aged 85) Towson, Maryland, U.S.
- Resting place: Arlington National Cemetery
- Party: Democratic
- Spouse: Hazel Johnson (m. 1958; died 1963)
- Relatives: Clarence Mitchell Jr. (brother); Clarence Mitchell III (nephew)
- Education: Morgan State University (BA); University of Maryland, College Park (MA)

Military service
- Branch: United States Army
- Service years: 1942–1945
- Unit: 92nd Infantry Division
- Conflict: World War II

Parren James Mitchell (April 29, 1922 – May 28, 2007) was an American politician who served as a U.S. congressman affiliated with the Democratic Party representing the 7th congressional district of Maryland from January 3, 1971, to January 3, 1987. He was the first African American elected to Congress from Maryland.

== Early life ==
Mitchell was born in Baltimore, Maryland. His father, Clarence Maurice Mitchell, was a waiter, and his mother, Elsie Davis Mitchell, was a homemaker. Mitchell graduated from Frederick Douglass Senior High School in Baltimore in 1940. Mitchell served as an officer in the 92nd Infantry Division during World War II, and was wounded in Italy; he received the Purple Heart. He earned his bachelor's degree from Morgan State University, and his master's degree from the University of Maryland, College Park. In 1950, Mitchell sued the then segregated University of Maryland for admission to the graduate school with support from the Baltimore Branch of the NAACP, and won admission. When he graduated he was the first African-American to do so from that school.

Before entering graduate school, Mitchell participated in the early civil rights activity in Baltimore. These included protests against segregated seating at Ford's Theatre in downtown Baltimore City, and unequal funding for teacher training programs in the city's segregated black school system in 1948. Parren Mitchell was the brother of the late Clarence Mitchell Jr., who was head of the NAACP's Washington office and was one of Lyndon Johnson's chief advisers during the Civil Rights Movement.

== Congressional career ==
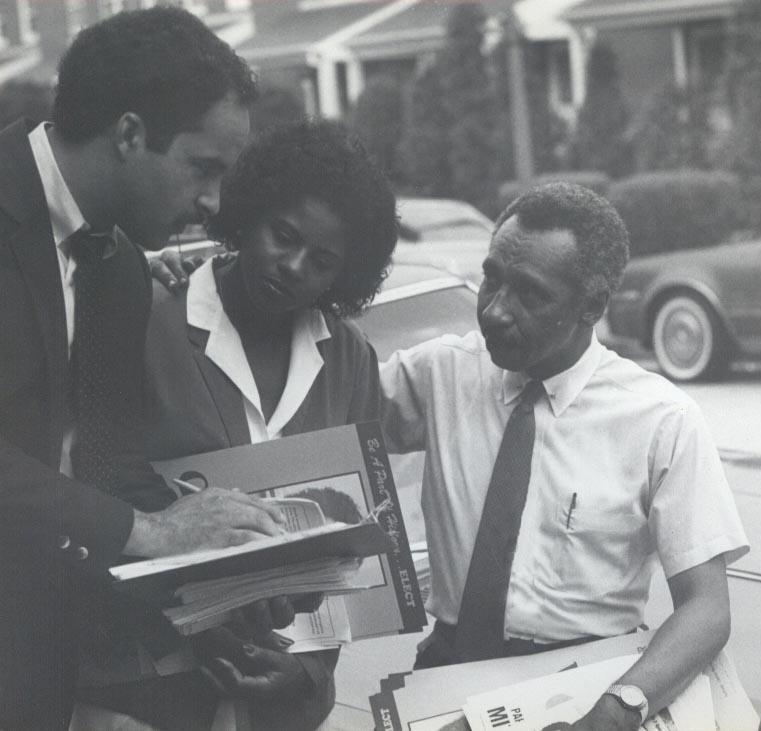
Mitchell campaigning on the streets of Baltimore in August 1982 with Georgia Gosslee and Curt Anderson

In 1968, Mitchell challenged nine-term Democratic incumbent Samuel Friedel in the Democratic primary and lost. He sought a rematch in 1970, and this time defeated Friedel by only 38 votes. He then breezed to an election in November, becoming the first African-American elected to Congress from Maryland. After the 1970 census, the 7th was redrawn as a black-majority district—Maryland's first. Mitchell was reelected seven more times from this district, never dropping below 75 percent of the vote. He even ran unopposed in 1974 and 1984 and only faced minor-party opposition in 1976 and 1978.

Mitchell was one of the founding members of the Congressional Black Caucus. One of his first actions with the caucus was to boycott President Richard M. Nixon's State of the Union address in 1971 after Nixon refused to meet the group. Nixon met the caucus weeks later.

In 1983 he joined with 7 other Congressional Representatives to sponsor a resolution to impeach Ronald Reagan over his sudden and unexpected invasion of Grenada.

During his 16-year career, he fought for affirmative action legislation. As Chairman of the Small Business Committee, Mitchell attached an amendment to a $4 billion public works bill that compelled state and local governments, seeking federal grants, to set aside 10% of the funds to retain minority firms as contractors and subcontractors.

Mitchell also mentored several dozen young up and coming leaders, several of whom held public office. Maryland House of Delegates majority whip Talmadge Branch was an early aide, Delegate Nathaniel Oaks volunteered in Mitchell's early campaigns, as did Delegates Sandy Rosenberg and Curt Anderson.

Mitchell initiated a congressional investigation into Wedtech where bribes were alleged to have been offered in return for no bid military contracts. His nephews State Senators Clarence Mitchell III and Michael Mitchell ended up serving time in Federal prison for their parts in the scandal. In 1986 Mitchell retired from Congress to run unsuccessfully for Lieutenant Governor of Maryland as the running mate of Attorney General Stephen H. Sachs. In later years, after a series of strokes, he was placed in a nursing home but still made periodic appearances at community events.

== Death and legacy ==
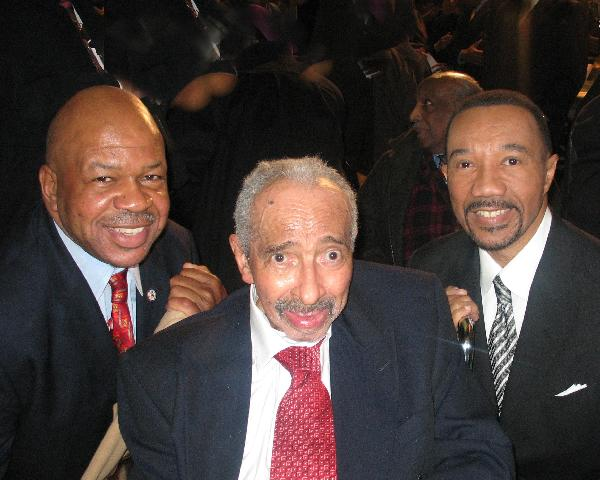
Mitchell with Kweisi Mfume and Elijah Cummings in January 2007

Mitchell died on May 28, 2007, of pneumonia at Greater Baltimore Medical Center in Towson, Maryland, after being hospitalized for a week. He was 85.

On June 5, 2007, more than 1,000 people paid their last respects to the Congressman at the St. James' Episcopal Church in west Baltimore. Maryland Senators Ben Cardin and Barbara Mikulski paid tributes to Mitchell on behalf of the United States Senate; Speaker Nancy Pelosi paid tribute on behalf of the House of Representatives; Judiciary Chairman Representative John Conyers on behalf of the Congressional Black Caucus; and Governor Martin O'Malley on behalf of the state of Maryland. Congressman Elijah Cummings delivered the eulogy saying: "He earned the trust of people throughout the country and the world because he was constantly building bridges for others to cross, while tearing down the walls that had excluded them."

On December 3, 2015, the University of Maryland, College Park held a dedication ceremony renaming the Art/Sociology Building in his honor.

In November 2023, Baltimore elected officials announced plans to renovate Mitchell's house into the West Baltimore Civic and Entrepreneurship Center, which will include a gallery showcasing his life and career in Congress. The renovations are expected to cost around $2.2 million, including $1.5 million in state funding, and will take two years to complete.

== See also ==
- List of African-American United States representatives

== Notes ==
U.S. House of Representatives
Preceded by Samuel Friedel	Member of the U.S. House of Representatives from Maryland's 7th congressional district 1971–1987	Succeeded by Kweisi Mfume
Preceded by Yvonne Brathwaite Burke	Chair of the Congressional Black Caucus; 1977–1979	Succeeded by Cardiss Collins
Preceded by Neal Smith	Chair of the House Small Business Committee; 1981–1987	Succeeded by John J. LaFalce
