= A. James Clark School of Engineering =

Engineering school of the University of Maryland

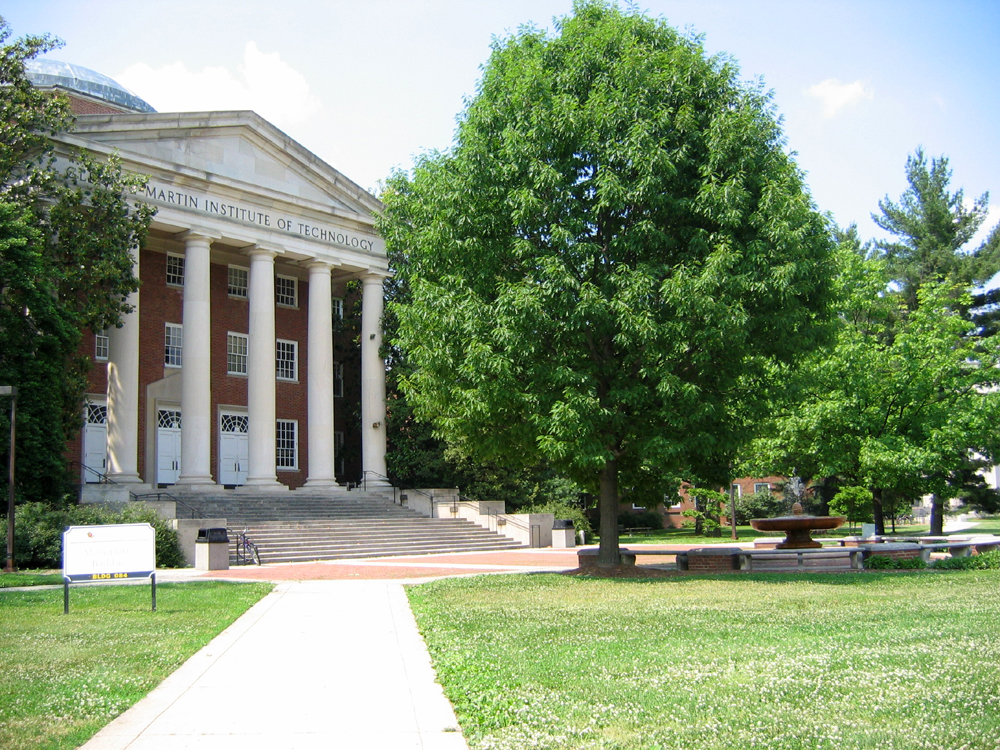
- Glenn L. Martin Institute of Technology in 2007
- Type: Public
- Established: 1894
- Dean: Samuel Graham, Jr.
- Undergraduates: 4,116
- Postgraduates: 2,166
- Location: College Park, Maryland, United States; 38°59′27.4″N 76°56′17.4″W
- Campus: Suburban
- Website: eng.umd.edu

The A. James Clark School of Engineering is the engineering school of the University of Maryland, College Park. The school consists of fourteen buildings on the College Park campus that cover over 750,000 sq ft (70,000 m^{2}). The school is near Washington, D.C. and Baltimore, as well as several technology-driven institutions.

The Clark School hosts eight different departments: Aerospace engineering, Bioengineering, Chemical and Biomolecular engineering, Civil and Environmental engineering, Electrical and Computer engineering, Fire protection engineering, Materials Science and engineering, and Mechanical engineering. The Clark School also offers graduate programs where students can pursue Master of Science, Master of Engineering, and Doctor of Philosophy degrees. The Clark School has over 4,000 undergraduate students, 2,000 graduate students, and nearly 200 faculty members. The school also hosts diversity initiatives such as a Women in Engineering Program and a Center for Minorities in Science and Engineering.

== History ==
The Clark School was founded in 1894 as The College of Engineering at what was then known as the Maryland Agricultural College. In 1949, the school was renamed the Glenn L. Martin College of Engineering and Aeronautical Sciences. The name was changed for a second time in 1955 to the Glenn L. Martin Institute of Technology. In 1994, the college took its current name, the A. James Clark School of Engineering. A. James Clark was a 1950 engineering graduate of the university who was chairman and chief executive officer of Clark Enterprises, Inc. Clark's financial gifts to the university were honored, in return, with the name of the Engineering School.

=== Early history ===
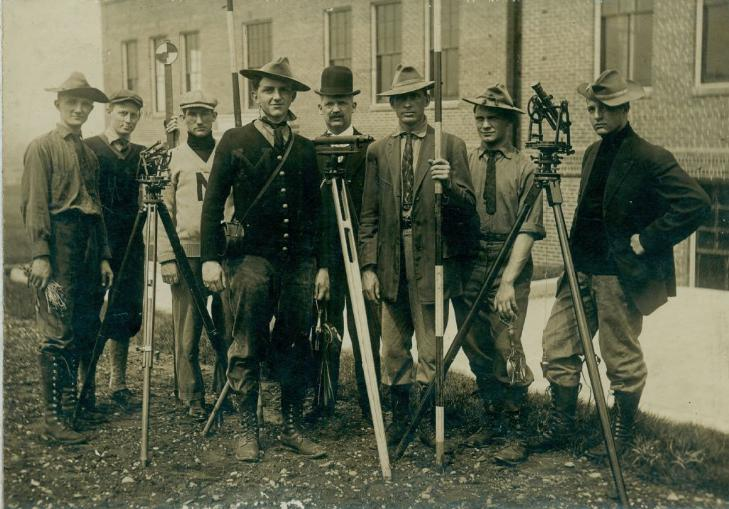
Civil engineering students of the Maryland Agricultural College, circa the 1890s.

Although no formal engineering program existed at the Maryland Agricultural College, the early curriculum included surveying, construction, mechanics, and electricity courses. During the early years of the university, much of the coursework centered around preparing students for a career in agriculture.

A formal program in engineering was introduced in 1894 when the president of the university, Richard W. Silvester, requested that the secretary of the Navy detail Lieutenant John D. Ford of the U.S. Navy Engineering Corps to organize the Department of Mechanical Engineering. The first faculty member appointed to teach in the department was Harry Gwinner, and John Hanson Mitchell was the first student awarded a B.S. in mechanical engineering in 1898. The Department of Mechanical Engineering was housed in what is now Taliaferro Hall.

In 1908, the college created the Department of Civil Engineering, followed closely by the creation of the Department of Electrical Engineering. In 1915, the three departments were organized into the Engineering Division. Dr. T.H. Taliaferro was appointed dean of the Engineering Division upon its creation.

=== 1915-1944 ===
In 1917, the university reorganized, creating the College of Engineering and Mechanic Arts. In 1921, the college changed its name to the College of Engineering and appointed Arthur N. Johnson as dean. In 1926, the college developed its first master's program in the electrical engineering department. The remaining departments established master's programs shortly after that. In 1936, the College of Engineering appointed S. Sidney Steinberg as dean. The first Ph.D. was granted in 1939 by the Department of Chemical Engineering.

In 1932, Evelyn B. Harrison became the first woman to graduate from the College of Engineering. She graduated with a B.S. in Civil Engineering.

When the United States joined World War II in 1941, the College of Engineering faced many changes. The College of Engineering instituted several specialized training programs to aid the war effort. In 1943, the college created an Army Specialized Training Program to provide students with language and advanced engineering skills. The college also instituted a Civil Aeronautics Pilot Training Program, training students to be pilots for the Military Air Transport Service. The College of Engineering also shortened the duration of its academic programs to accelerate training for technical branches of the Army. Enrollment dropped significantly during World War II but accelerated quickly following the war as students returned to the University of Maryland on the G.I. Bill. During the war, the College of Engineering moved from its original home in Taliaferro Hall to what is now H.J. Patterson Hall.

=== 1944-1975 ===
In 1944, aeronautical entrepreneur Glenn L. Martin, president of the Glenn L. Martin Company, donated funds to the College of Engineering to construct new engineering buildings. Martin's gift to the college resulted in the construction of four new engineering buildings, including the Glenn L. Martin Wind Tunnel. Martin also donated funds designated for aeronautical research. Named for Martin's mother, the Minta Martin Fund for Aeronautical Research was created in 1954.

The college renamed itself the Glenn L. Martin College of Engineering and Aeronautical Sciences in 1949 to recognize Martin's gifts. Also, in 1949, the Department of Aerospace Engineering was established. The Department of Fire Protection Engineering was established in 1956. Following World War II, the College of Engineering developed into a strong research institution, with more emphasis placed on research by both students and faculty. Throughout the 1960s and 1970s, each department established a Ph.D. program, further strengthening the college's growing reputation as a research institution. In 1956, Frederick T. Mavis was appointed dean of the College of Engineering.

In 1965, Robert Beckman was appointed dean of the College of Engineering. The College of Engineering grew during the 1960s and 70s as the United States placed more emphasis on technology and development during the Cold War. Throughout the 1970s, the college devoted more attention to recruiting women and minority students to engineering, creating programs for local high school students, and hiring staff members to mentor women and minority students. In 1970, the college instituted a Cooperative Engineering Education Program to help students incorporate employment and career development into their field of academic study. In 1975, the college created the Instructional Television System (ITV) to provide graduate-level education to working engineers in the area through television.

=== 1975-1995 ===
In 1977, the college appointed George Dieter as dean. Student enrollment in the College of Engineering expanded throughout the 1970s and 1980s in response to the Very Large Scale Integration revolution. In 1981, the college implemented regulations to restrict undergraduate admission to the College of Engineering based on test scores and academic standing. At the same time, they also created the College Honors Program. Graduate programs in the College of Engineering experienced growth during this period. With the growth of graduate programs came growth in research funding and opportunities. During the 1980s and 1990s, the College of Engineering developed several research institutes and secured research funding from various scientific grants and foundations.

In 1990, the College of Engineering became a member of the Engineering Coalition of Schools for Excellence in Engineering and Leadership. The program's main goals were to integrate design into the undergraduate engineering curriculum. This led to the development of a hands-on first-year design course in the College of Engineering.

In the 1980s and 1990s, College of Engineering students became heavily involved in national design competitions. Some of the most prominent competitions during these years included Baja racing, solar car design, concrete canoe design and racing, and walking robot contests.

In 1994, as the college celebrated its 100th anniversary, alumnus A. James Clark created the A. James Clark Centennial Endowment Fund to support undergraduate engineering education. In recognition of this gift, the Board of Regents renamed the college the A. James Clark School of Engineering.

In 1994, William W. Destler was appointed dean of the Clark School. This same year, the Clark School also established the Office of Advanced Engineering Education (OAEE). OAEE provides flexible engineering education options to working engineers so that they may earn a Master of Engineering or Graduate Certificate in Engineering.

=== 1995–present ===
In 1997, the college established the Department of Computer Engineering and combined it with the Department of Electrical Engineering to form the Department of Electrical and Computer Engineering in 1999. In 1999, Herbert Rabin was named Interim Dean of the Clark School. Also in 1999, the college renamed the Department of Civil Engineering as the Department of Civil and Environmental Engineering to better reflect changes in the field.

Nariman Farvardin was appointed dean of the Clark School in 2000. In 2002, the college split the Department of Materials and Nuclear Engineering, establishing the Department of Materials Science and Engineering. The college transferred the Nuclear and Reliability Engineering programs to the Department of Mechanical Engineering. In 2004, the Department of Chemical Engineering changed its name to the Department of Chemical and Biomolecular Engineering.

In 2005, Robert E. Fischell donated to the Clark School to create the Fischell Department of Bioengineering, officially established in 2006. In 2007, Herbert Rabin once again became the Interim Dean. In 2009, Darryll Pines was appointed Dean of the Clark School of Engineering. Under his guidance, the Clark School continued to build a reputation in research, teaching, and student engagement.

== Facilities ==
AIM Lab Dedicated to the characterization of the structure and composition of a broad spectrum of hard and soft materials and biological systems with nanometer resolution. Features Tescan GAIA and XEIA FIB/SEM systems.

Autonomous Vehicle Laboratory Dedicated to research and development in the area of biologically inspired design and robotics. The lab seeks to distil the fundamental sensing and feedback principles that govern locomotive behavior in small organisms that will enable the next generation of autonomous microsystems. Students come from multi-disciplinary engineering programs and pursue applied research, especially in the prototype development of biologically inspired autonomous vehicles for civilian and military applications.

Bioprocess Scale-Up Facility Dedicated to the development and scale-up of fermentation biotechnology products and processes.

Center for Advanced Life Cycle Engineering (CALCE) is a research facility focused on risk assessment, management, and mitigation for electronic products and systems. CALCE was created in 1985 with support from the United States National Science Foundation as a University Industry Cooperative Research Center. CALCE is the largest electronic products and systems research center focused on electronics reliability and is dedicated to providing a knowledge and resource base to support the development of competitive electronic components, products, and systems. CALCE was founded by Professor Michael Pecht.

Glenn L. Martin Wind Tunnel A state-of-the-art facility used for research and development in aerodynamics. Constructed in 1949 as part of the construction funded by Glenn L. Martin. The facility has performed aerodynamics testing over 2,200 times on objects ranging from airplanes to cars to bobsleds.

Rolf Jensen and Associates Fire Science Laboratory Performs research on fire behavior and protection products. It contains eight laboratories dedicated to fire prevention, suppression, protection, and engineering.

MakerBot Innovation Center 3D printing space open to students, faculty, staff, and community members.

Micro and Nano Fabrication Laboratory Research classroom that supports research and development in nanoscience, microelectromechanical systems, semiconductors, materials, and devices for electronics, bioscience and engineering, and sensor systems.

Neutral Buoyancy Research Facility The A. James Clark School of Engineering currently operates one of two neutral buoyancy tanks in the United States and is the only one in the world located on a college campus. The Neutral Buoyancy Research Facility was originally developed to support NASA studies of orbital operations, and Clark School students now use it for innovation and research.

Radiation Facilities Includes a training nuclear reactor, a dry cell gamma vault irradiator, and a 10 MEV electron linear accelerator to support research and teaching.

Robotics Realization Laboratory Space for students to design, build, and test robot designs. Facility provides robots for manufacturing and medical applications as well as for mechanical and electrical rapid prototyping.

Tissue Engineering and Biomaterials Laboratory It is dedicated to developing biomaterials that improve the quality of life for ill or injured patients. It focuses on studying biomaterials for the delivery of therapeutics, scaffolds for orthopedic tissue engineering applications, and the interaction of biomaterials and tissues.

Unmanned Aircraft System Test Site Research and operations facility to accelerate the safe and responsible application of unmanned aerial vehicles in private and public industry.

== Reputation ==
In 2026, the A. James Clark School of Engineering was ranked 21st in the nation in Undergraduate Engineering and 18th in the nation for Graduate Engineering by the U.S. News & World Report.

== Notable people ==
=== Alumni ===
The following individuals are alumni of the A. James Clark School of Engineering at the University of Maryland. Graduating class year is denoted in parentheses.

- Ashish Bagai (1990, M.S. 1992, Ph.D. 1995) - Pioneer in aerodynamic design of rotorcraft blades, member of Clark School Innovation Hall of Fame
- Angel P. Bezos (1969) - Co-founder of Pulse Electronics, Inc., member of Clark School Innovation Hall of Fame
- Frederick S. Billig (M.S. 1958, Ph.D. 1964) - pioneer of scramjet technology, member of Clark School Innovation Hall of Fame
- Nathan Bluzer (1967, Ph.D. 1974) - Pioneer in infrared, visible, and multispectral sensors, member of Clark School Innovation Hall of Fame
- Romald E. Bowles (Ph.D. 1956) - Father of fluidics, member of Clark School Innovation Hall of Fame
- Robert Briskman (1961) - Co-founder of Sirius Radio, member of Clark School Innovation Hall of Fame
- Harry Clifton Byrd (1908) - President of the University of Maryland from 1935 to 1954
- S. Joseph Campanella (M.S. 1957) - Pioneer in digital satellite communications, member of Clark School Innovation Hall of Fame
- Robert S. Caruthers (1926) - Pioneer in multiplexing and long-distance telephony, member of Clark School Innovation Hall of Fame
- A. James Clark (1950) - Chairman and CEO of Clark Enterprises, Inc.
- William P. Cole Jr. (1910) - Lawyer and U.S. Congressman
- Gordon R. England (1961) - Deputy Secretary of Defense
- Jeanette J. Epps (M.S. 1994, Ph.D. 2000) - NASA astronaut
- Emilio A. Fernandez (1969) - Co-founder of Pulse Electronics, Inc., member of Clark School Innovation Hall of Fame
- Michael D. Griffin (1977) - Director of the National Aeronautics and Space Administration (NASA)
- Hamid Jafarkhani (M.S. 1994, Ph.D. 1997) - Contributions to space-time algorithms for wireless communications systems, member of Clark School Innovation Hall of Fame
- Jerry Krill (Ph.D. 1978) - Developer of Cooperative Engagement Capacity sensor network system, member of Clark School Innovation Hall of Fame
- Raymond J. Krizek (M.S. 1961) - Advanced field of geotechnical engineering and slurry mechanics, member of Clark School Innovation Hall of Fame
- Fritz Kub (Ph.D. 1985) - Innovator of gallium nitride LEDs and microwave transistors, member of Clark School Innovation Hall of Fame
- Rajiv Laroia (M.S. 1989, Ph.D. 1992) - Advancements in telephone and mobile wireless communication, member of Clark School Innovation Hall of Fame
- George J. Laurer (1951) - Developed the Universal Product Code (UPC), member of the Clark School Innovation Hall of Fame
- Edward A. Miller (1950) - 2005 Charles Stark Draper Prize recipient, Assistant Secretary of the Army for Research and Development, member of the Clark School Innovation Hall of Fame
- Naomi Leonard (Ph.D. 1994) - Research in control and dynamical systems, member of Clark School Innovation Hall of Fame
- Yagyensh C. Pati (1986, M.S. 1988, Ph.D. 1992) - Development of phase-shift lithography, member of Clark School Innovation Hall of Fame
- James W. Plummer (M.S. 1953) - 2005 Charles Stark Draper Prize recipient, Director of the National Reconnaissance Office, member of the Clark School Innovation Hall of Fame
- Charles H. Popenoe (1957) - Inventor of SmartBolts, member of Clark School Innovation Hall of Fame
- Tim Regan (1977) - Chief Executive Officer for The Whiting-Turner Contracting Company
- Judith Resnik (1977) - Astronaut killed aboard the Space Shuttle Challenger
- Paul W. Richards (M.S. 1991) - Astronaut on Discovery mission
- Lloyd M. Robeson (Ph.D. 1967) - Technological contributions in polymer blends, copolymers, membranes, adhesives, and plastics, member of Clark School Innovation Hall of Fame
- Harry B. Smith (M.S. 1949) - Inventor of Pulse-Doppler radar, member of Clark School Innovation Hall of Fame
- Edward St. John (1950) - Founder of St. John Properties
- Robert Stoll (1969) - Former U.S. commissioner of patents
- Tim Sweeney - Game developer, founder and CEO of Epic Games
- Florence Tan (1987) - NASA Engineer
- Millard Tydings (1910) - U.S. Congressman and Senator
- C. Frank Wheatley Jr. (1951) - Inventor of insulated gate bipolar resistor, member of Clark School Innovation Hall of Fame
- Philip Wiser (1990) - Chief Technology Officer of CBS

=== Inductees to the National Academy of Engineering ===
The following are inductees into the National Academy of Engineering associated with the University of Maryland. The election year is denoted in parentheses.

- John D. Anderson (2010) - Professor Emeritus of Aerospace Engineering at the University of Maryland and Curator of Aerodynamics at the National Air and Space Museum at the Smithsonian Institution. Elected for contributions in hypersonic gas dynamics.
- Gregory B. Baecher (2006) - Professor of Civil and Environmental Engineering at the University of Maryland. Elected for reliability-based approaches to geotechnical and water-resources engineering.
- Howard R. Baum (2000) - Professor of Fire Protection Engineering at the University of Maryland and Scientist Emeritus at the National Institute of Standards and Technology. Elected for developing numerical tools for understanding and mitigating fire phenomena.
- James W. Dally (1984) - Professor Emeritus of Mechanical Engineering at the University of Maryland. Elected for contributions to dynamic photoelasticity, stress wave propagation, and fracture mechanics.
- George E. Dieter (1993) - Professor Emeritus of Mechanical Engineering at the University of Maryland. Elected for contributions to engineering education in the area of materials design.
- Millard S. Firebaugh (2000) - Professor of Mechanical Engineering at the University of Maryland. Elected for innovation in submarine design, propulsion, and construction.
- Robert E. Fischell (1989) - Chief Executive Officer of ZyGood and Clark School benefactor. Elected for contributions to satellite altitude control and innovation in bringing aerospace technology to implantable biomedical devices.
- Gerald E. Galloway Jr. (2004) - Professor of Civil and Environmental Engineering at the University of Maryland. Elected for leadership in the management of sustainable water resources.
- Jacques Gansler (2002) - Professor Emeritus of Public Policy at the University of Maryland and Chief Executive Officer of ARGIS Group. Elected for contributions in teaching missile guidance and control systems.
- Eugenia Kalnay (1996) - Professor of Mechanical Engineering, Civil and Environmental Engineering, and Atmospheric and Oceanic Science at the University of Maryland. Elected for advances in understanding atmospheric dynamics, numerical modeling, and atmospheric predictability.
- Jeong H. Kim (2004) - President of Bell Labs, Clark School benefactor, and University of Maryland alum (Ph.D. 1991). Elected for contributions to national defense and security through improved battlefield communications.
- C. Daniel Mote Jr. (1988) - Former president of the University of Maryland and President of the National Academy of Engineering. Elected for analysis of the mechanics of complex dynamical systems.
- Elaine Oran (2003) - Professor of Aerospace Engineering, Fire Protection Engineering, and Mechanical Engineering at the University of Maryland. Elected for unifying engineering, scientific, and mathematical disciplines into a computational methodology to solve aerospace combustion problems.
- Darryll Pines (2019) - Dean of the Clark School of Engineering and Professor of Aerospace Engineering. Elected for contributions to engineering education.
- Ben Shneiderman (2010) - Professor Emeritus of Computer Science at the University of Maryland. Elected for research, software development, and scholarly texts concerning human-computer interaction and information visualization.
- Katepalli Sreenivasan (1999) - Former professor of physics and mechanical engineering at the University of Maryland and current dean of New York University Tandon School of Engineering. Elected for the application of modern non-linear dynamics to turbulent flows.
- G.W. Stewart (2004) - Professor Emeritus of Computer Science at the University of Maryland. Elected for developing numerical algorithms and software widely used in engineering computation.
- Ali Mosleh (2010) - Professor Emeritus of Reliability Engineering and Mechanical Engineering at the University of Maryland. Elected for contributions to the development of Bayesian methods and computational tools in probabilistic risk assessment and reliability engineering.
- James E. Hubbard Jr. (2016) - Professor of Aerospace Engineering at the University of Maryland. Elected for advances in the modeling, design, analyses, and application of adaptive structure.
- Kevin Gerald Bowcutt (2015) - University of Maryland alumni (B.S. 1982, M.S. 1984, Ph.D. 1986). Senior Technical Fellow and Chief Scientist of Hypersonics at the Boeing Company. Elected for the development and demonstration of air-breathing hypersonic vehicles and the implementation of design optimization methods.
- Eugene M. Rasmusson (1999) - Professor Emeritus of Atmospheric and Oceanic Science at the University of Maryland. Elected for contributions to understanding climate variability and establishing the basis for practical predictions of El Niño.
- Hratch G. Semerjian (2000) - Research Scientist in Chemical and Biomolecular Engineering at the University of Maryland. Chief Scientist Emeritus at the National Institute of Standards and Technology. Elected for developing powerful laser diagnostic flames and for providing measurement methods, standards, and data to the chemical and biochemical industry.
- Ivo Babuška (2005) - Former professor of mathematics at the University of Maryland. Elected for contributions to the theory and implementation of finite element methods for computer-based engineering analysis and design.
- Howard Frank (2002) - Former professor of management science at the University of Maryland. Elected for contributions to the design and analysis of computer communication networks.

=== Benefactors ===
The following individuals are notable benefactors of the A. James Clark School of Engineering. If an alumnus of the Clark School graduating class year is denoted in parentheses.

- Robert Fischell - Medical instruments inventor, earned an M.S. in physics from the University of Maryland in 1953, a member of the Clark School Innovation Hall of Fame.
- Glenn L. Martin - Aerospace industry pioneer, member of the Clark School Innovation Hall of Fame.
- A. James Clark (1950) - Chairman and Chief Executive Officer of Clark Enterprises, Inc.
- Jeong H. Kim (Ph.D. 1991) - President of Bell Labs, member of the Clark School Innovation Hall of Fame.
- Brian Hinman (1982) - Entrepreneur and educational innovator, member of the Clark School Innovation Hall of Fame.
