= Glenn L. Martin Wind Tunnel =

Coordinates: 38.9899°N 76.9369°W

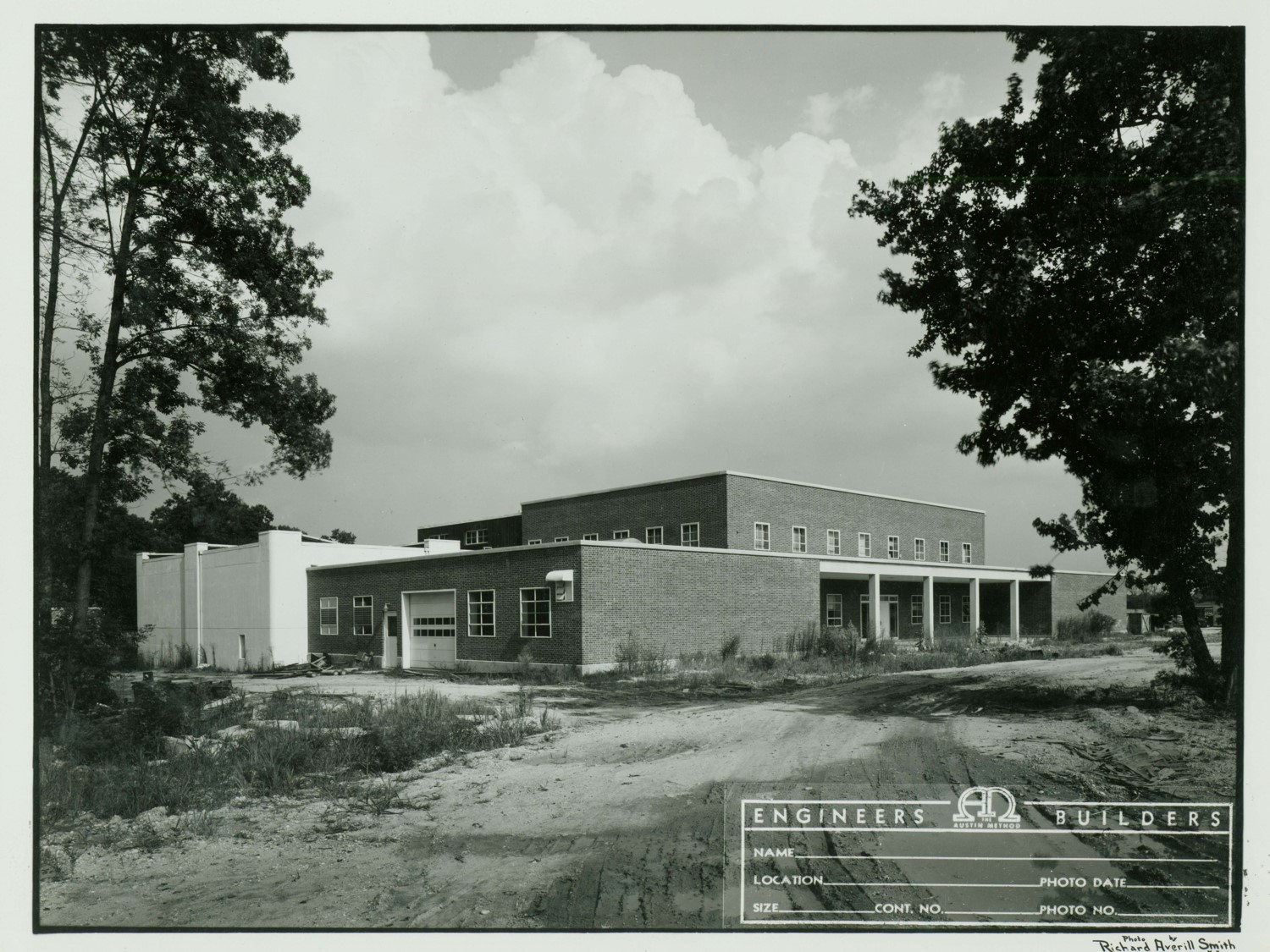

General information
- Type: low speed wind tunnel
- Location: University of Maryland, College Park, College Park, Maryland, United States
- Opened: 1949

Website
- https://windtunnel.umd.edu/

The Glenn L. Martin Wind Tunnel was founded in 1949 after Glenn L. Martin gave a grant to the University of Maryland, College Park. This grant was used to expand the A. James Clark School of Engineering and build Glenn L. Martin Hall. The tunnel has served many clients over the years, conducting over 2000 tests. The tunnel is a low speed wind tunnel participating in testing ranging from automotive to aviation and more. The current director of the tunnel is Dr. Jewel Barlow. The tunnel is an auxiliary resource to the University of Maryland, generating all necessary income to continue operation of the tunnel. They work primarily with external clients interested in developing products with aerodynamics in mind.

== History ==
The tunnel was built at the University of Maryland after a grant from Glenn L. Martin. The creation of the tunnel was to serve two purposes. First to create a facility where Martin could do testing for his company, Martin Aircraft. The second was to provide a space for students at the university to gain experience and instruction. At time of construction in 1948, the tunnel cost $1.25 Million to build. The tunnel was initially a top secret facility used for government testing. After it was declassified, the facility began working with a wide range of external clients, ranging from Boeing to Ford. During the 1970s, the tunnel aided in the creation of some revolutionary automotive designs. Both the Ford GT40 as well as the original Taurus were designed at the Glenn L. Martin Wind Tunnel. The GT40 went on to win four 24 Hours of Le Mans races. The Taurus was one of the first production cars designed with aerodynamics as a significant part of the design.

== Technical Details ==
The Glenn L. Martin Wind Tunnel is the second largest university run tunnel in the United States. It has test section dimensions of 7.75' X 11.04' with corner fillets and a test section area of 85.04 sq. ft. The test section speed ranges from 2 mph to 230 mph. The propeller used has blades modified from that of a B29 Bomber and is driven by a 2250 HP AC synchronous electric motor. The tunnel uses a 6 component external yolk balance to measure the forces and moments acting on models being tested there.
