= History of the University of Maryland, College Park =

The history of the University of Maryland, College Park began in 1856, when the Maryland Agricultural College was chartered. The state took complete control of the school in 1916, and consequently the institution was renamed Maryland State College. In a massive 1988 restructuring of the state higher education system, the school was designated as the flagship campus of the newly formed University of Maryland System and was formally named University of Maryland, College Park.

== Early history ==
On March 6, 1856, the forerunner of today's University of Maryland was chartered as the Maryland Agricultural College. Two years later, Charles Benedict Calvert, a slaveowner, descendant of the Barons Baltimore, fervent believer in agricultural education, and a future U.S. Congressman, purchased 420 acres (1.7 km^{2}) of the Riversdale Plantation in College Park for $21,000. Calvert founded the school later that year with money earned by the sale of stock certificates. On October 5, 1859, the first 34 students entered the Maryland Agricultural College, including four of Charles Calvert's sons, George, Charles, William, and Eugene. The keynote speaker on opening day was Joseph Henry, the first Secretary of the Smithsonian Institution.

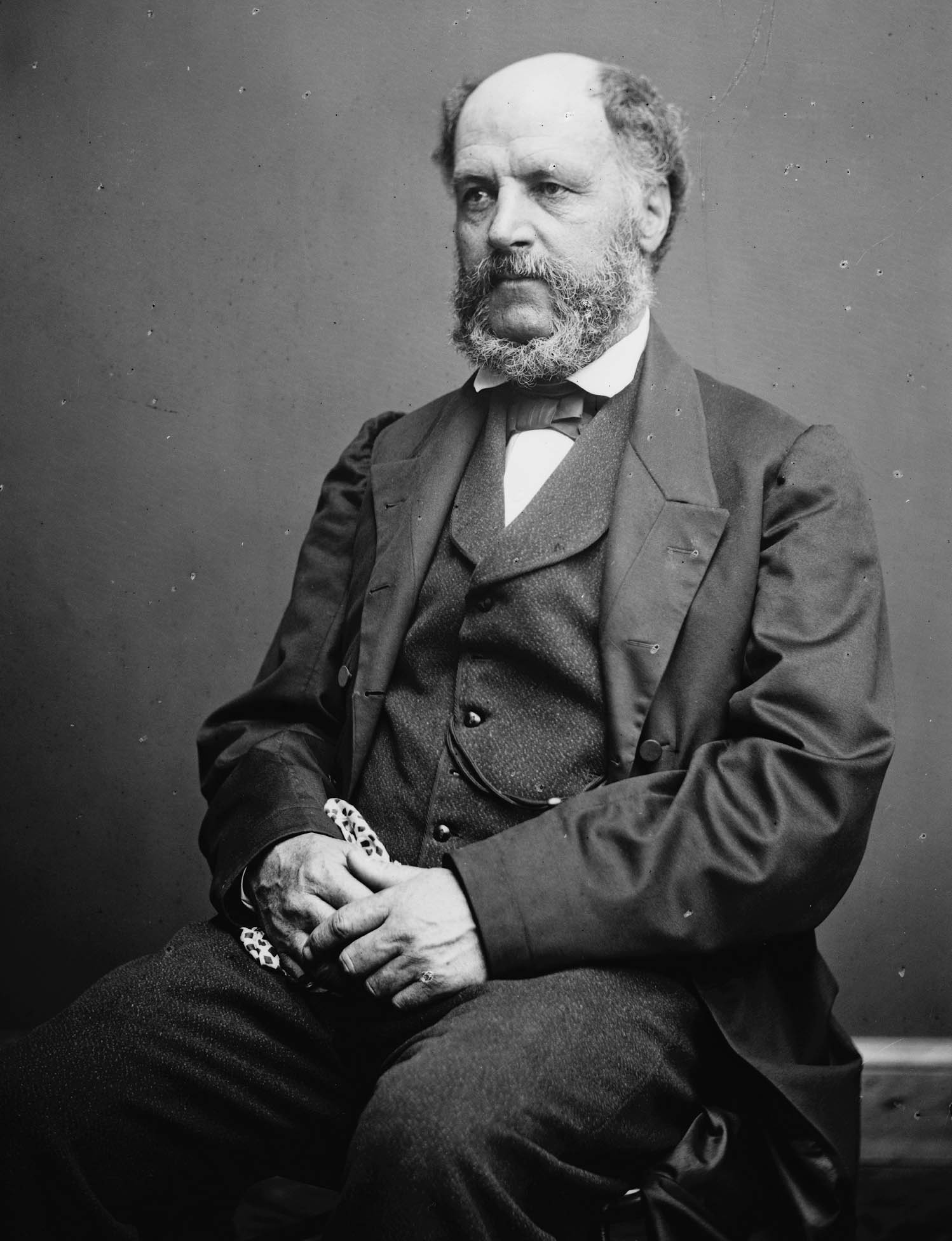
Charles Benedict Calvert, founder

In July 1862, the same month that the Maryland Agricultural College awarded its first degrees, President Lincoln signed the Morrill Land Grant Act. The legislation provided federal funds to schools that taught agriculture or engineering, or provided military training. Taking advantage of the opportunity, the school became a land grant college in February 1864 after the Maryland legislature voted to approve the Morrill Act.

== Civil War ==
A few months after accepting the grant, the Maryland Agricultural College proved to be an important site in the Civil War. In April 1864, General Ambrose E. Burnside and 6,000 soldiers of the Union's Ninth Army Corps camped on the MAC campus. The troops were en route to reinforce General Ulysses S. Grant's forces in Virginia.

Later that summer, around 400 Confederate soldiers led by General Bradley T. Johnson stayed on the grounds while preparing to take part in a raid against Washington. A local legend claims that soldiers were warmly welcomed by university President Henry Onderdonk, a Confederate sympathizer, and that the cavalrymen were thrown a party on the campus nicknamed "The Old South Ball." The next morning the soldiers rode off to cut the lines of communication between Washington and Baltimore.

Financial problems forced the increasingly desperate administrators to sell off 200 acres (81 ha) of land, and the continuing decline in student enrollment sent the Maryland Agricultural College into bankruptcy. For the next two years the campus was used as a boys preparatory school.

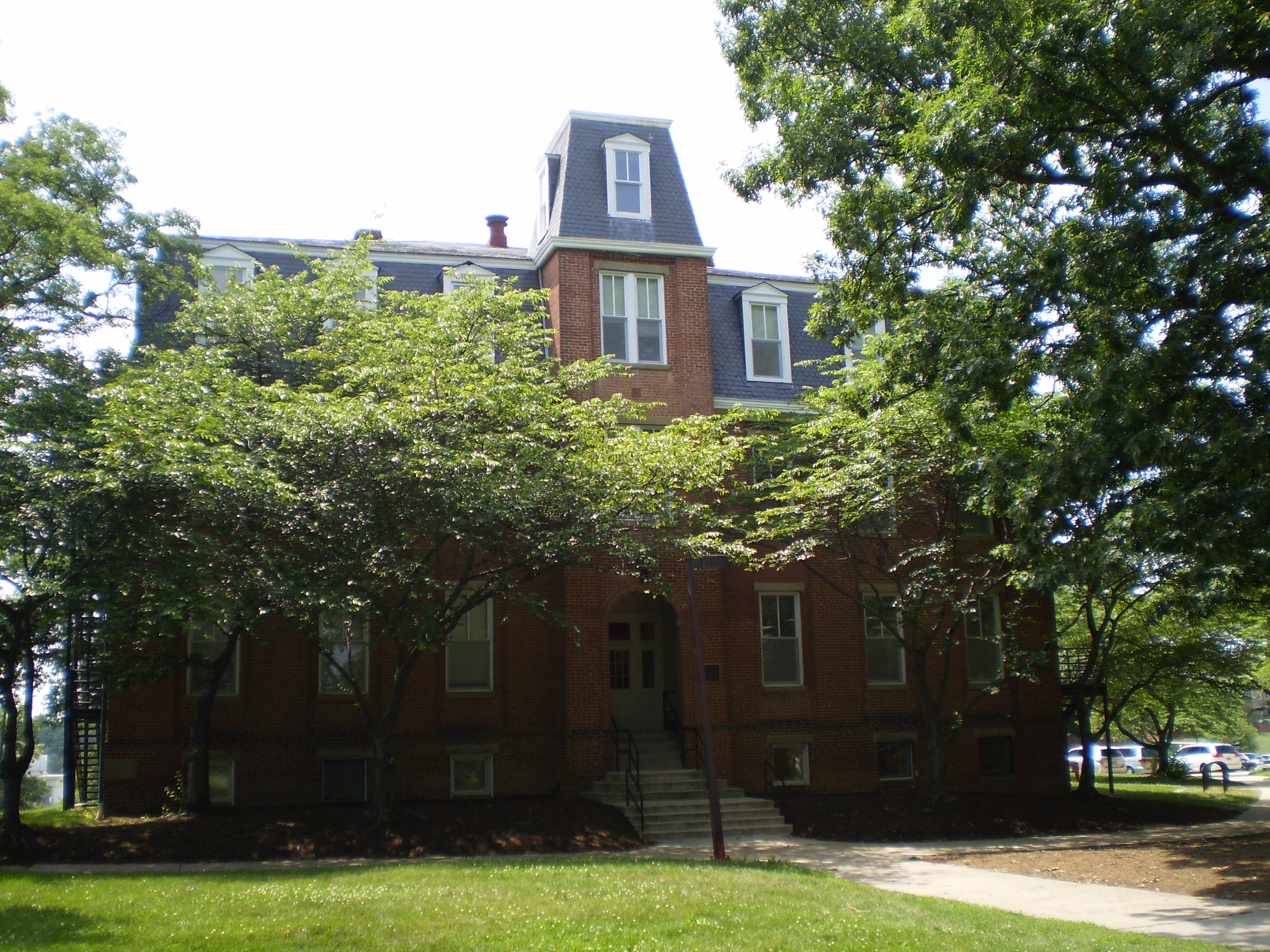
Morrill Hall, built in 1898, is the oldest academic building on campus.

Following the Civil War, the Maryland legislature pulled the college out of bankruptcy, and in February 1866 assumed half ownership of the school. The college thus became in part a state institution. George Washington Custis Lee, son of Confederate General Robert E. Lee, was appointed president of the college by the Board of Trustees, but due to public outcry declined the position. By October 1867, the school reopened with 11 students. In the next six years, enrollment continued to grow, and the school's debt was finally paid off. Twenty years later, the school's reputation as a research institution began, as the federally funded Agricultural Experiment Station was established there. During the same period, a number of state laws granted the college regulatory powers in several areas—including controlling farm disease, inspecting feed, establishing a state weather bureau and geological survey, and housing the board of forestry. In 1888, the college began its first official intercollegiate baseball games against rivals St. John's College and the United States Naval Academy. Baseball, however, had been played at the college for decades before the first "official" games were recorded. The first fraternity chapter at Maryland, the Eta chapter of Phi Sigma Kappa, was established in 1897, and Morrill Hall (the oldest instructional building still in use on campus) was built the following year.

== Great Fire of 1912 ==
The Great Fire

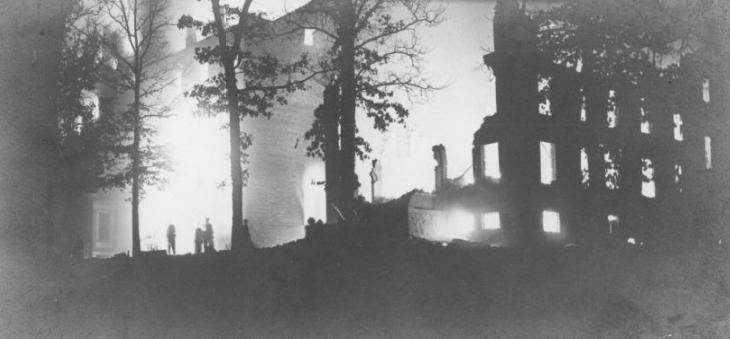
The campus ablaze during the 1912 fire

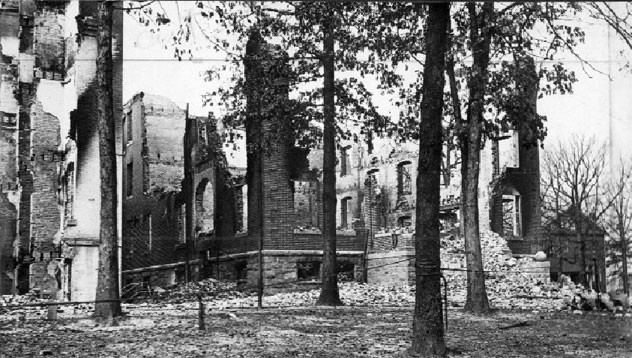
The remains of the administration building

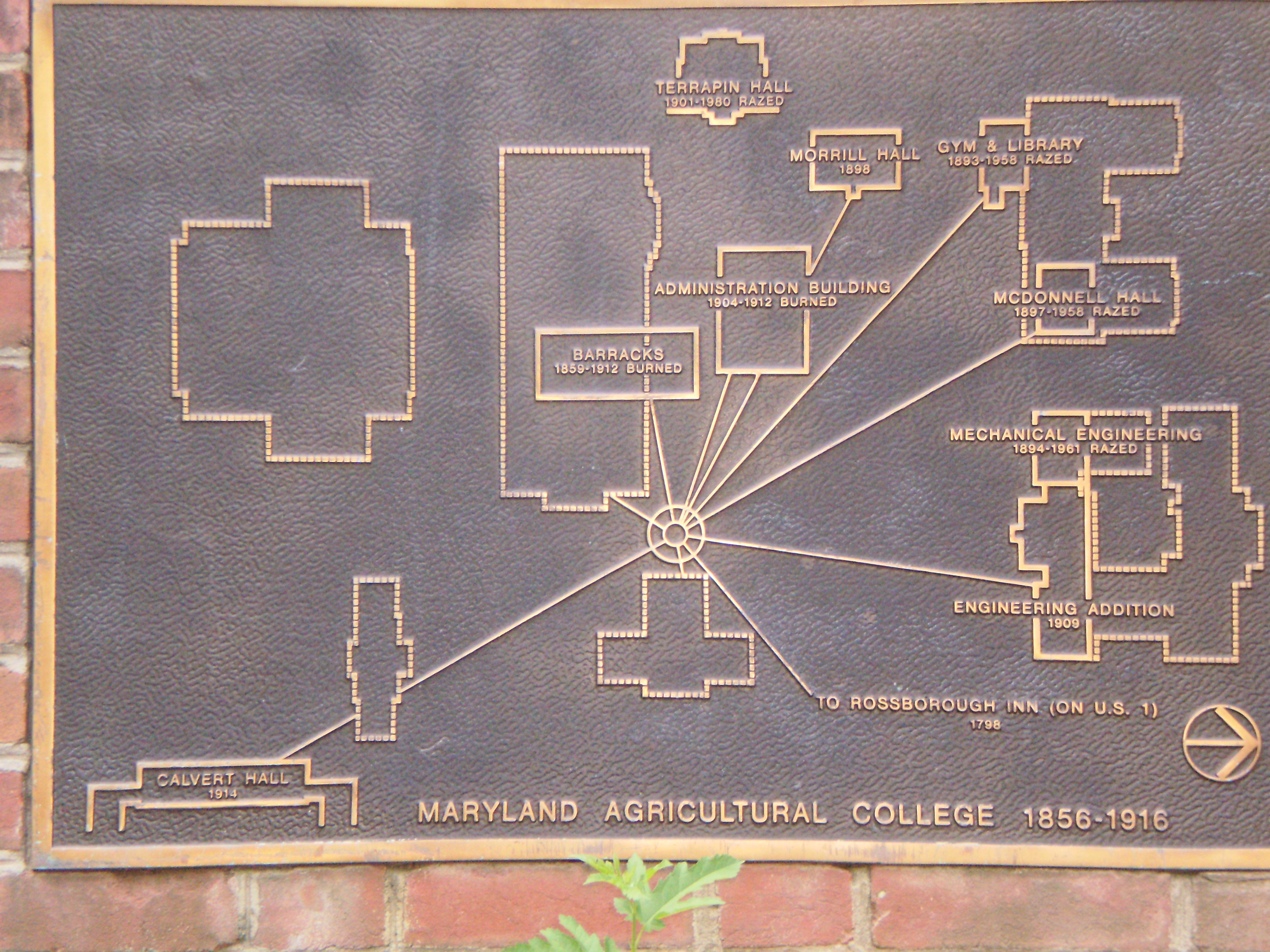
original layout of campus before the Great Fire

On November 29, 1912, at around 10:30 pm, a fire, probably due to faulty electric wiring, broke out in the attic of the newest administration building, where a Thanksgiving dance was being held. The approximately 80 students on the premises evacuated themselves safely, and then formed a makeshift bucket brigade. The fire departments summoned from nearby Hyattsville and Washington, D.C., arrived too late. Fanned by a strong southwest wind, the fire destroyed the barracks where the students were housed, all the school's records, and most of the academic buildings, leaving only Morrill Hall untouched. The loss was estimated at $250,000 (about $5.8 million in 2012 U.S. dollars) despite no injuries or fatalities. The devastation was so great that many never expected the university to reopen. University President Richard Silvester resigned, brokenhearted.

However, the students refused to give up. All but two returned to the university after the break and insisted on classes continuing as usual. Students were housed by families in neighboring towns who were compensated by the university until housing could be rebuilt, although a new administration building was not built until the 1940s.

A large brick and concrete compass inlaid in the ground designates the former center of campus as it existed in 1912. Lines engraved in the compass point to each building that was destroyed in the Thanksgiving Day fire. The intersection of the lines on the compass are known as "The Point of Failure". A well-known legend holds that any student who walks upon the "point of failure" will not graduate from the University of Maryland in four years. The "point of failure" is used by many students to scare freshmen and new students who come to UMD, despite it being a myth.

== Modern history ==
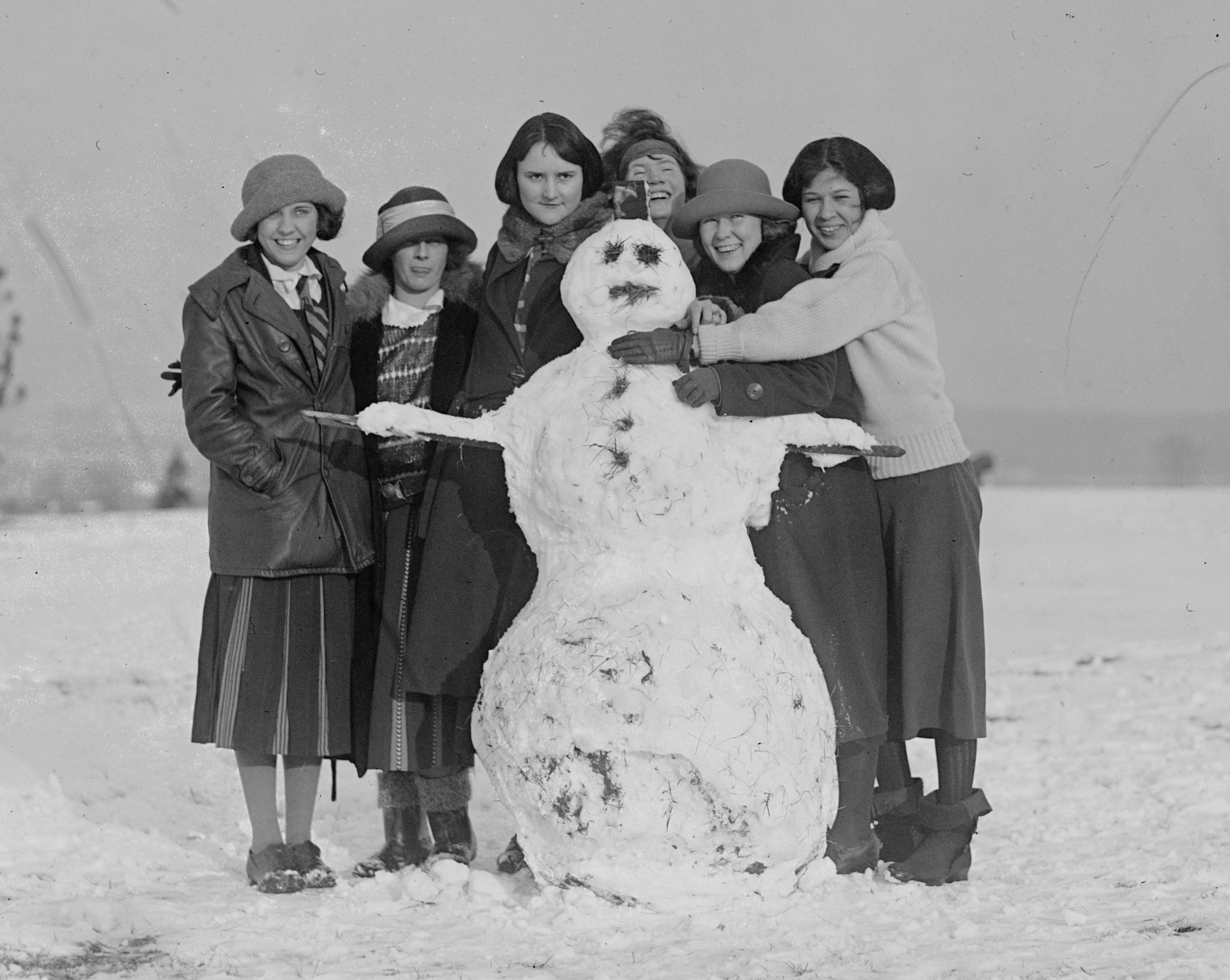
Early "co-ed" students at Maryland State College, 1923

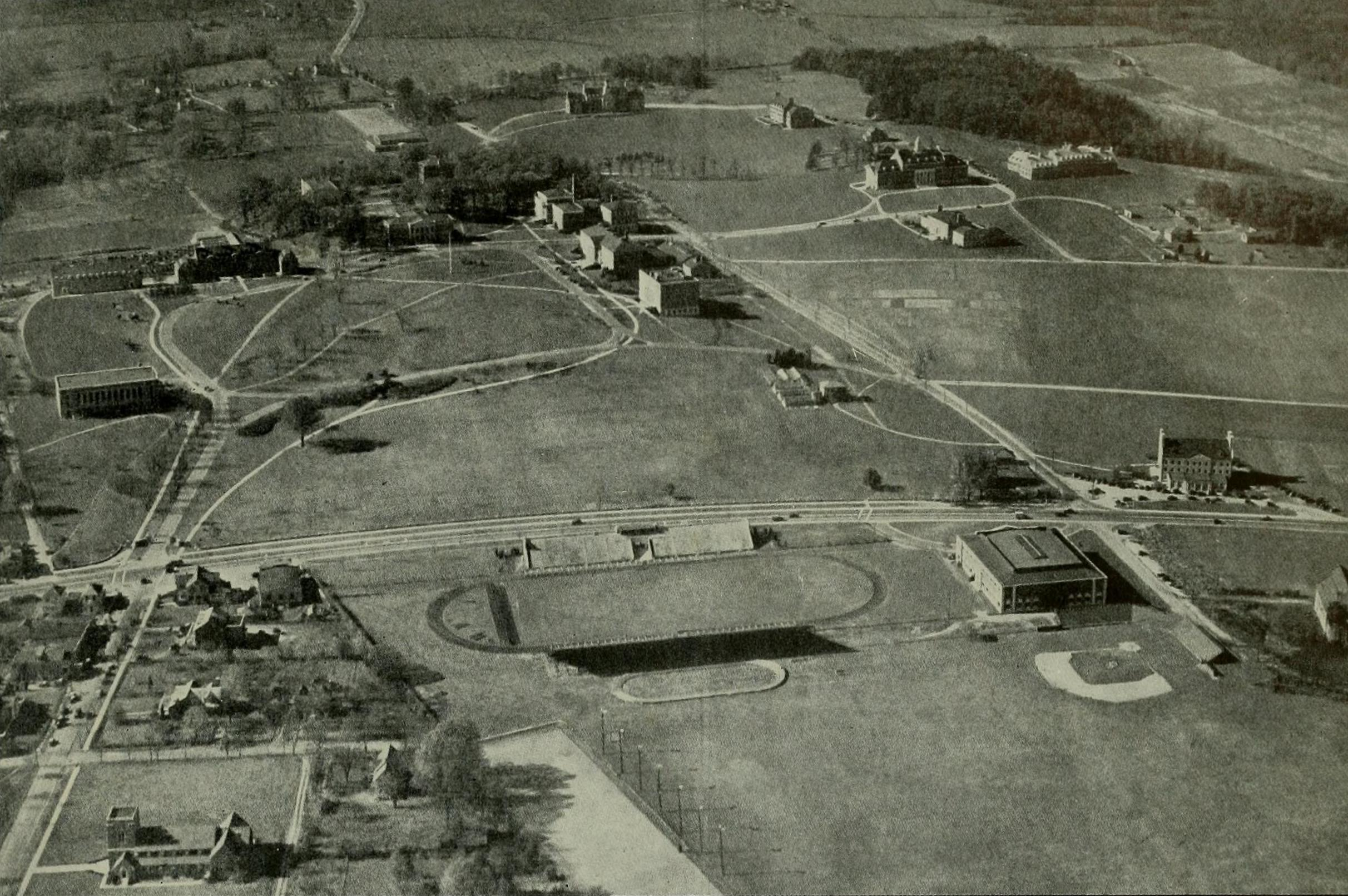
The University of Maryland campus as it appeared in 1938 before the expansion engineered by President Byrd

The state took complete control of the school in 1916, and consequently the institution was renamed Maryland State College. Also that year, the first female students enrolled at the school. On April 9, 1920, the college became part of the existing University of Maryland, replacing St. John's College, Annapolis as the university's undergraduate campus. In the same year, the graduate school on the College Park campus awarded its first PhD degrees and the university's enrollment reached 500 students. In 1925 the university was accredited by the Association of American Universities.

During World War II, Maryland was one of 131 colleges and universities nationally that took part in the V-12 Navy College Training Program which offered students a path to a Navy commission.

By the time the first black students enrolled at the university in 1951, enrollment had grown to nearly 10,000 students—4,000 of whom were women. Elaine J. Coates was the first African American student to graduate from the University of Maryland in 1959. Prior to 1951, many black students in Maryland were enrolled at the University of Maryland, Eastern Shore, which was almost shut down in 1947 due to lack of access, low quality education, and the fear among some black and white leaders that Eastern Shore was allowed to remain a college by the Regents of the University of Maryland solely to keep black students in segregated, inferior institutions.

In 1957 President Wilson H. Elkins made a push to increase academic standards at the university. His efforts resulted in the creation of one of the first Academic Probation Plans. The first year the plan went into effect, 1,550 students (18% of the total student body) faced expulsion. Since then, academic standards at the school have steadily risen. Recognizing the improvement in academics, Phi Beta Kappa established a chapter at the university in 1964. In 1969, the university was elected to the Association of American Universities. The school continued to grow, and by the fall of 1985 reached an enrollment of 38,679. Like many colleges during the Vietnam War, the university was the site of student protests and had curfews enforced by the National Guard.

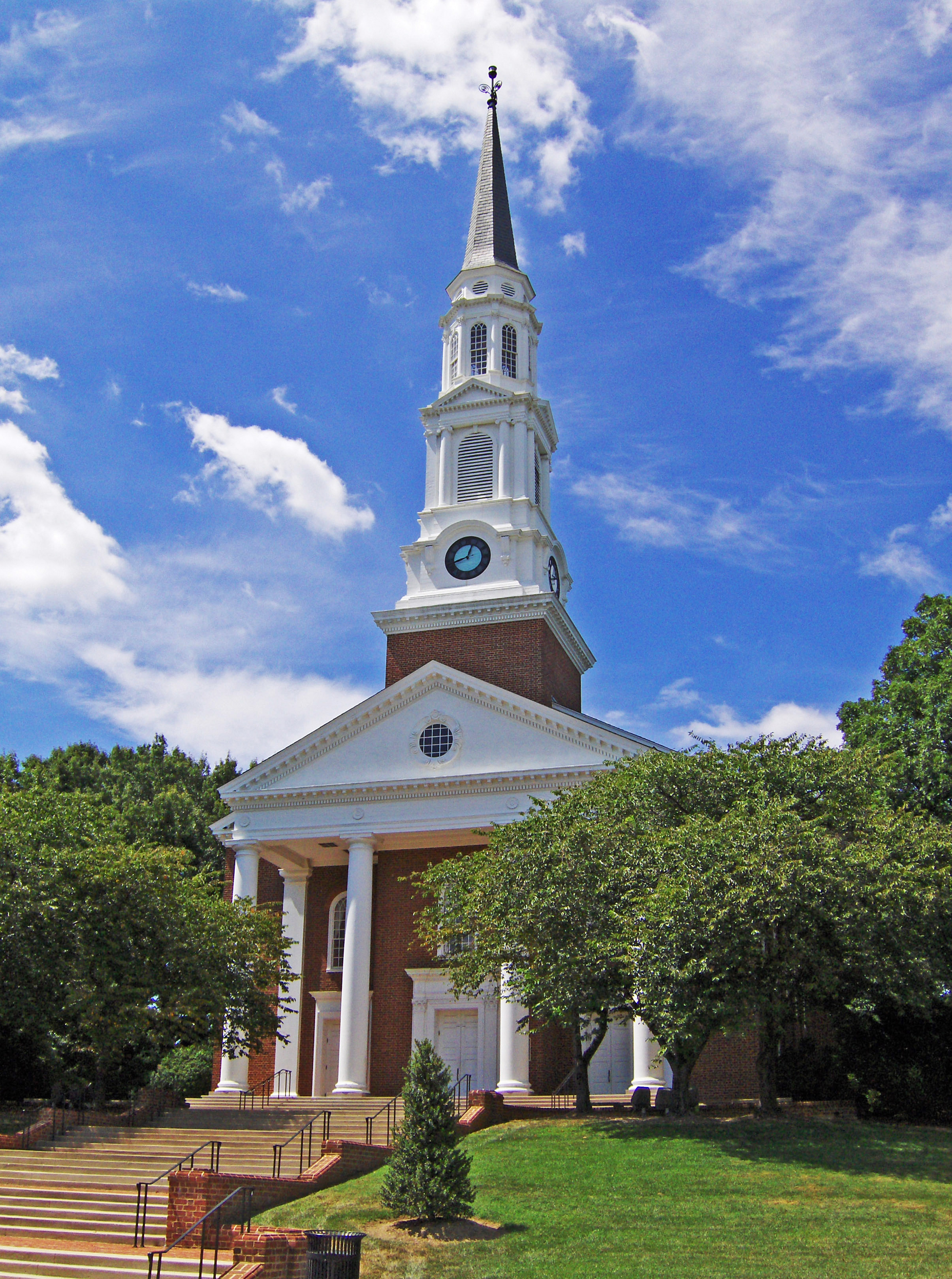
Memorial Chapel

In 1970 the Maryland General Assembly established a five-campus University of Maryland network comprising University of Maryland at Baltimore, University of Maryland Baltimore County, University of Maryland, College Park, University of Maryland Eastern Shore, and the University of Maryland University College.

In a massive 1988 restructuring of the state higher education system, the school was designated as the flagship campus of the newly formed University of Maryland System (later changed to the University System of Maryland in 1997) and was formally named University of Maryland, College Park. All of the 5 campuses in the former network were designated as formally distinct campuses in the new system. However, in 1997 the Maryland General Assembly passed legislation allowing the University of Maryland, College Park, to be known simply as the University of Maryland, recognizing the campus' role as the flagship institution of the University System of Maryland.

The other University System of Maryland institutions with the name "University of Maryland" are not satellite campuses of the University of Maryland, College Park. The University of Maryland, Baltimore, is the only other school permitted to confer certain degrees from the "University of Maryland".{{Citation needed|date=November 2025}} This is because the Baltimore school offers primarily graduate degrees in disciplines not taught in College Park, such as nursing, dentistry, law, and medicine. The relationship between the University of Maryland, College Park, and the University of Maryland, Baltimore, is akin to the relationship of the University of California, Berkeley, to the University of California, San Francisco (UCSF), which also primarily offers graduate programs that Berkeley does not provide.

In 1994, the National Archives at College Park completed construction and opened on a parcel of land adjoining campus donated by the University of Maryland, after lobbying by President William Kirwan and congressional leaders to foster academic collaboration between the institutions.

In 1999, the first Maryland Day event was held.

== 21st century ==
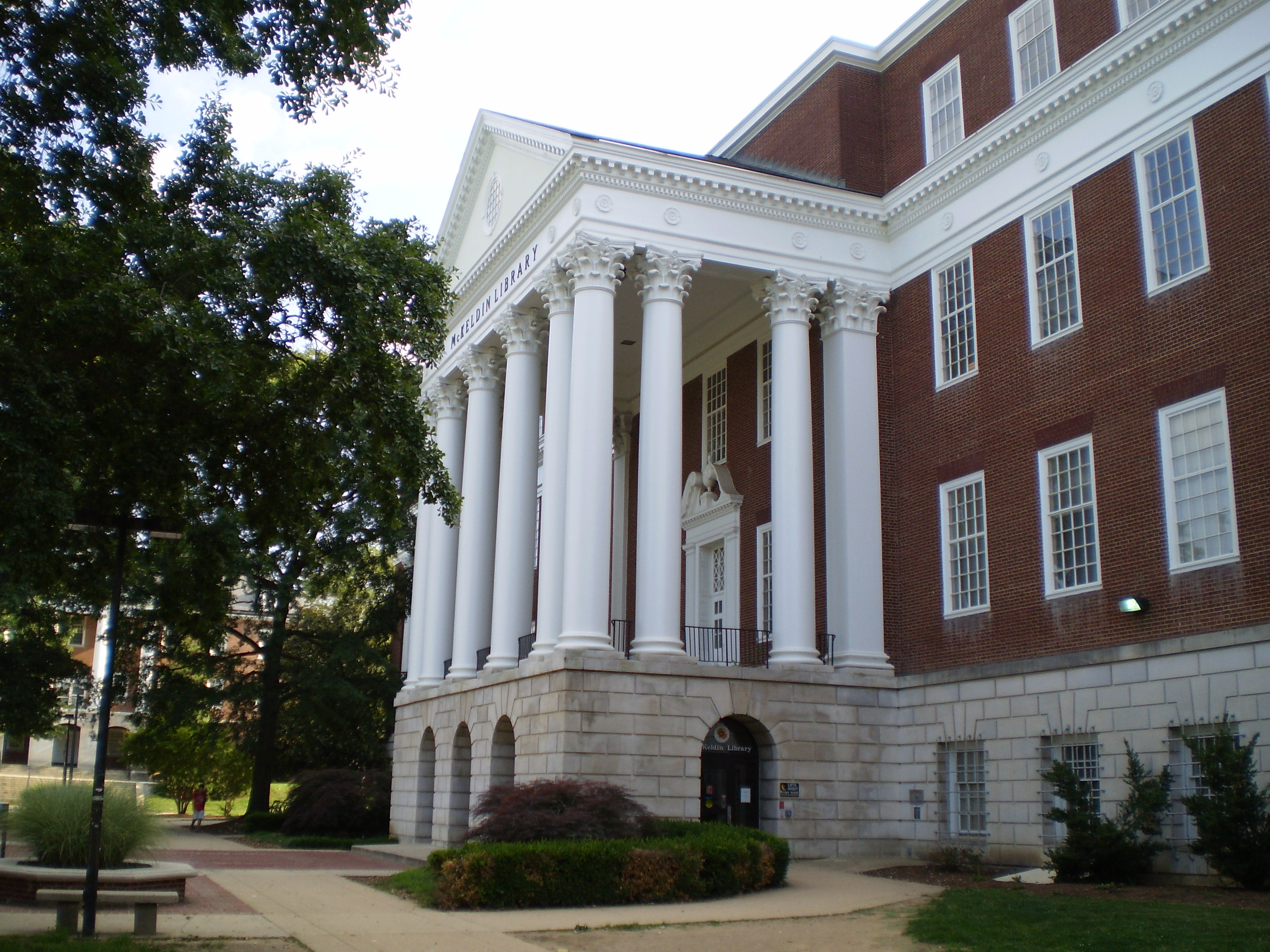
McKeldin Library.

On September 24, 2001, a tornado struck the College Park campus, killing two female students and causing $15 million in damage to 12 buildings. That same year brought the opening of the Clarice Smith Performing Arts Center, the largest single building ever constructed by the State of Maryland, which replaced Tawes Theatre as the premier fine arts center on campus.

In 2004, the university began constructing the 150-acre (61 ha) "M Square Research Park," which is the largest research park inside the Capital Beltway, and includes facilities affiliated with the U.S. Department of Defense, Food and Drug Administration, and the new National Center for Weather and Climate Prediction, affiliated with The National Oceanic and Atmospheric Administration (NOAA).

The university launched its 7-year campaign to raise $1 billion via private donations, called "Great Expectations," in 2006. The university published a new 10-year strategic plan in 2008, which includes plans for the East Campus Redevelopment Project which would bring, among other things, on-campus graduate student housing and a state-of-the-art music and entertainment center to campus.

In May 2010, ground was broken on a new $128-million, 158,068-square-foot (14,685.0 m^{2}) Physical Science Complex, including an ARRA-funded advanced quantum science laboratory, which the university hopes will be the premier facility for such research in the world.

The university's administration has recently become embroiled in the debate over the construction of a light-rail line through campus which would give the university another link to the Washington Metro system. On August 16, 2010, Wallace Loh, the Provost of the University of Iowa, was named President of the university effective November 1.

Dr. Darryll J. Pines became the 34th President of the university on April 22, 2021.
