= David Driskell =

American painter, scholar, and curator (1931–2020)

David C. Driskell
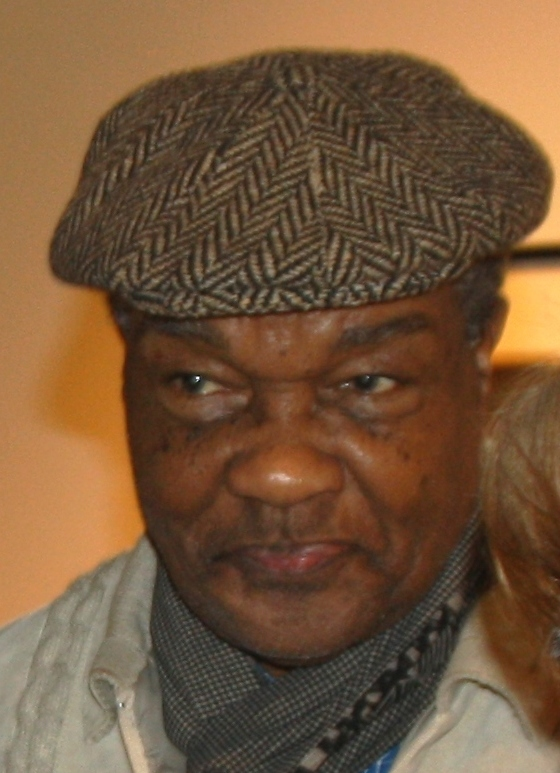
- Born: David Clyde Driskell; June 7, 1931; Eatonton, Georgia, US
- Died: April 1, 2020 (aged 88); Washington, D.C., US
- Education: Howard University (BA); Catholic University of America (MFA); Skowhegan School of Painting and Sculpture
- Notable work: Two Centuries of Black American Art
- Awards: National Humanities Medal, 2000

Woman with Flowers by David Driskell, 1972

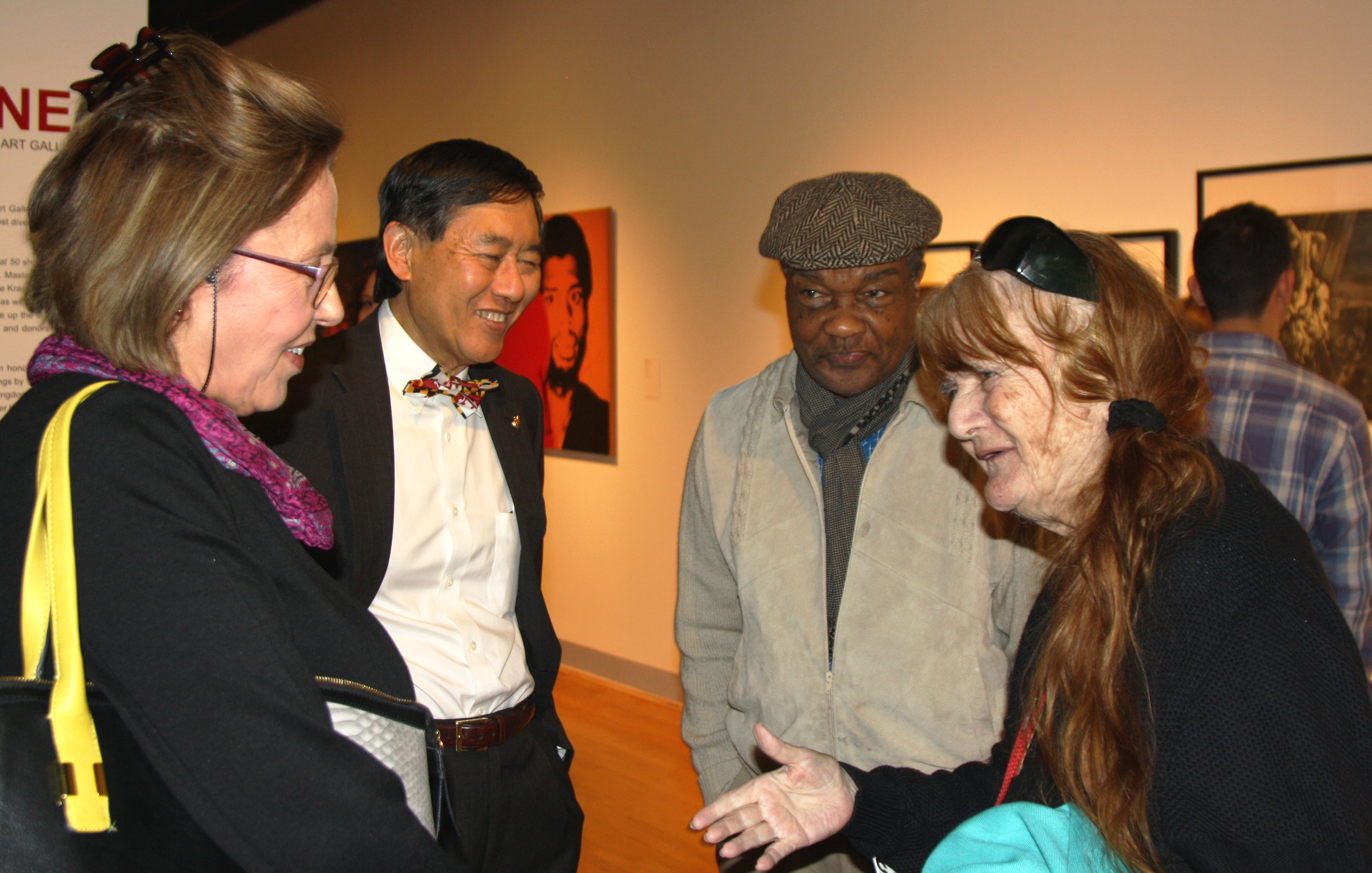
The University of Maryland, College Park Art Gallery celebrated its 50th anniversary on February 24, 2016, with a memorable art exhibition. Among those attending were President Wallace Loh and his wife, Barbara (left); and Prof. David C. Driskell, along with Prof. Dagmar R. Henney (right). Photo courtesy University of Maryland Art Gallery, used with permission.

David C. Driskell (June 7, 1931 – April 1, 2020) was an American artist, scholar and curator recognized for his work in establishing African-American Art as a distinct field of study. In his lifetime, Driskell was cited as one of the world's leading authorities on the subject of African-American Art. Driskell held the title of Distinguished University Professor of Art Emeritus at the University of Maryland, College Park. The David C. Driskell Center at the University of Maryland, is named in his honor.

== Early life and education ==
David Clyde Driskell was born in 1931 in Eatonton, Georgia. He was the son of George Washington Driskell, a Baptist minister, and Mary Cloud Driskell, a homemaker. His grandfather, William Driskell, was born into slavery in 1862, and taught himself Methodist doctrine, becoming a minister. When David Driskell was five years old, he moved with his family to Appalachia in western North Carolina, where he attended segregated elementary and high schools.

Art was already embedded in his family life before he went to college; his father created paintings and drawings on religious themes, his mother made quilts and baskets, and his grandfather was a sculptor.

Driskell attended Howard University in Washington, D.C., graduating with a bachelor's degree in art in 1955. He started off studying painting and history until meeting James A. Porter, an acclaimed African-American art historian, who took him under his wing and encouraged him to study art history. Driskell was influenced by James V. Herring, another of his professors at Howard, and Mary Beattie Brady, the director of the Harmon Foundation, an organization that collected work by African Americans. Driskell would continue to work closely with Brady throughout his early career.

In 1952, Driskell married Thelma Grace DeLoatch.

In 1953, he received a scholarship to attend the Skowhegan School of Painting and Sculpture.

== Career ==
=== Teaching ===
After teaching for several years at Talladega College in Alabama, Driskell went on to earn a Master of Fine Arts degree from Catholic University in 1962.

He was an associate professor of art at Howard University from 1963 to 1964. In 1964 he held a fellowship at the Netherlands Institute for Art History in The Hague.

In 1966 he joined the faculty of Fisk University in Nashville, as professor of art and chairman of the department. During his time at Fisk, Driskell curated a number of shows highlighting black artists including Aaron Douglas, William T. Williams and Ellis Wilson. He was a rigorous scholar and due to his careful cataloging of African-American works he began creating the archive and context for research into black art.

Driskell was a visiting professor at Bowdoin College in Brunswick, Maine, in the spring of 1973.

After ten years at Fisk, he moved to the University of Maryland, College Park, in 1976. He chaired the department there from 1978 to 1983 and, in 1995, was named Distinguished University Professor of Art. Driskell retired from the University of Maryland in 1998. In 2001, he was honored with the naming of the David C. Driskell Center for the Study of Visual Arts and Culture of African Americans and the African Diaspora, which presents exhibitions on African-American art and holds the Driskell archive.

Driskell had a long relationship with the Skowhegan School of Painting and Sculpture which began in 1953, the year he attended as a participant of the program. He was invited back as faculty in 1976, 1978, 1991, and 2004. He served on the Board of Governors from 1975 to 1989 and on the Board of Trustees from 1989 to 2001. He served on the Advisory Committee from 2003 until his death in 2020.

Driskell has been recognized as a mentor for developing art collectors for works by African-American artists, as well as advocating for "younger, up-and-coming artists".

David C. Driskell: Artist and Scholar by Julie L. McGee, a book detailing Driskell's life and work, was published in 2006.

Driskell died in Washington, D.C., on April 1, 2020, of complications from COVID-19 during the COVID-19 pandemic in Washington, D.C.

=== Curatorial work ===
During his seven-decade career as an art historian and curator, Driskell made contributions that are considered foundational to the field of African-American Art. He curated more than 35 exhibitions of work by black artists, including Jacob Lawrence, Romare Bearden, and Elizabeth Catlett.

In 1976, Driskell mounted Two Centuries of Black American Art for the Los Angeles County Museum of Art, which was the highest-profile exhibition of its kind at a major U.S. museum, and according to ARTnews, "staked a claim for the profound and indelible contributions of black and African-American art makers since the earliest days of the country." This landmark exhibition later traveled to the Dallas Museum of Fine Arts, the High Museum of Art in Atlanta, and the Brooklyn Museum. The exhibition featured more than 200 works by 63 artists as well as anonymous crafts workers and cemented the essential contributions of Black artists to American Visual culture.

Driskell's art collection has traveled to museums nationwide and includes work ranging from African tribal objects to contemporary works of art and "reflect the history of the black American experience". In 2000, about 100 works from his collection were presented at the High Museum of Art in an exhibition titled Narratives of African American Art and Identity: The David C. Driskell Collection.

Driskell has advised notable figures including Oprah Winfrey and Bill Cosby on their art collections. He also selected works that appeared on The Cosby Show. He later wrote a book about the Cosby's collection, The Other Side of Color: The African American Collection of Camille O. and William H. Cosby, Jr. In 1996, Driskell advised the White House on its purchase of Sand Dunes at Sunset: Atlantic City (1885) by Henry Ossawa Tanner, which became the first artwork in the White House's collection by a Black artist.

=== Artistic career ===
Current Forms: Yoruba Circle (1969) at the National Gallery of Art's showing of Afro-Atlantic Histories in Washington, D.C., 2022

Driskell created works of art including painting, drawing, collage and printmaking, often combining them in the creation of mixed media work. His work is challenging to categorize due to the diversity of his artistic practice, having worked both abstractly and figuratively, and utilizing a wide range of materials including oil paint, acrylic, egg tempera, gouache, ink, marker, and collage, on paper and both stretched and unstretched canvas. The subject matter of his work ranges from portraits of jazz singers, African gods and rituals, urban life, to landscapes around his summer home in Maine.

His work can be read in relationship to the Black Arts movement and Afrocentrism, but also reveals his engagement with art of various styles and time periods. His oeuvre reflects, "his openness to the times he is living in and his immediate circumstances, whether in his neighborhood or in nature," John Yao writes for Hyperallergic on the occasion of his 2019 solo exhibition at DC Moore Gallery.

A retrospective of Driskell's work, titled Icons of Nature and History, was co-organized by the High Museum of Art, Atlanta, and the Portland Museum of Art, Maine, with support from The Phillips Collection, Washington, DC, to open in February 2021 at the High Museum, with subsequent presentations at the Portland Museum of Art and at the Phillips Collection. The exhibition was planned to include more than 60 artworks, gathered from museums, private collections, and Driskell's estate, and representing his studio work from the 1950s to the 2000s. Julie McGee, author of a 2006 monograph about Driskell, guest-curated the retrospective.

Driskell's work was included in the 2025 exhibition Photography and the Black Arts Movement, 1955–1985 at the National Gallery of Art.

==== Solo exhibitions ====
- 2021: Celebrating Creative Genius: The Life, Art and Legacy of David Driskell, Steffen Thomas Museum of Art, Buckhead, Georgia
- 2019: David Driskell: Resonance, Paintings 1965-2002, DC Moore Gallery, New York, New York
- 2017: David Driskell: Renewal and Reform, Selected Prints, Center for Maine Contemporary Art, Rockland, Maine
- 2014: A Decade of David Driskell, The High Museum of Art, Atlanta, Georgia
- 2012: David Driskell, Creative Spirit: Five Decades, DC Moore Gallery, New York, New York
- October 30, 2010 - August 7, 2011: Evolution: Five Decades of Printmaking, Amistad Center for Art & Culture at the Wadsworth Atheneum, Hartford, Connecticut
- 2006: David Driskell: Painting Across the Decade 1996-2006, DC Moore Gallery, New York, New York

==== Group exhibitions ====
- 2025: David C. Driskell & Friends: Creativity, Collaboration, and Friendship, Frist Art Museum
- 2020: Tell Me Your Story, Kunsthal Kade, Amersfoort, Netherlands
- 2020: Riffs and Relations: African American Artists and the European Modernist Tradition, The Phillips Collection, Washington D.C.
- 2019: Soul of a Nation: Art in the Age of Black Power, Tate Modern, London, UK; Crystal Bridges Museum of American Art, Bentonville, Arkansas; The Brooklyn Museum, Brooklyn, New York; The Broad, Los Angeles, California

== Honors, awards, and legacy ==
Driskell received numerous awards including the Distinguished Alumni Award in Art from Howard University (1981), the Distinguished Alumni Award in Art from The Catholic University of America (1996), the President's Medal from University of Maryland (1997), and Skowhegan School of Painting and Sculpture's Lifetime Legacy Award (2016). He was honored by President Bill Clinton with the Presidential Medal as one of 12 recipients of the National Humanities Medal (2000). He has been awarded nine honorary Doctorates.

In 2005, the High Museum of Art established the David C. Driskell Prize to honor and celebrate contributions to the field of African-American art and art history. As of 2025, the Prize has continued to be awarded annually, recognizing a U.S.-based, early- or mid-career scholar or artist each year. Previous winners of the Prize have included Xaviera Simmons, Mark Bradford, Amy Sherald, Naomi Beckwith, and Alison Saar, among others. Additionally, proceeds from the annual Driskell Prize Dinner, a formal award ceremony, go to the museum's David C. Driskell African American Art Acquisition funds, supporting the acquisition of works by African-American artists.

Driskell was named a member of the American Academy of Arts and Sciences in 2018.

The David C. Driskell Center for the Study of Visual Arts and Culture of African Americans and the African Diaspora at the University of Maryland, College Park, was named in tribute to him and honors his legacy. In fall 2020, the Driskell Center presented a virtual exhibition, The David C. Driskell Papers, which included digitized reproductions of over 110 items, drawn from the more than 50,000 items in the collection overall, among them journal entries, writings, curatorial notes, exhibition catalogues, photographs, audio and video material, and ephemera.

In September 2020, the fourth annual John Wilmerding Symposium on American Art at the National Gallery of Art, Washington, D.C., honored Driskell's legacy, noting his "contribution as a distinguished university professor emeritus of art, and as an artist, art historian, collector, curator, and philanthropist".

In 2021, a documentary titled Black Art, directed by Sam Pollard, pays tribute to Driskell, featuring his views on how Black artists have been isolated from art history.

On May 4, 2021, the Hyattsville City Council voted in favor of renaming Magruder Park after David Driskell in an effort to formally abolish the park's segregationist past.

== Publications by Driskell ==
- Amistad II: Afro-American Art (editor), Nashville: Fisk University, 1975.
- Two Centuries of Black American Art, Los Angeles: Los Angeles County Museum of Art, 1976. ISBN 0-87587-070-8
- The Afro-American Collection, Fisk University, with Earl J. Hooks, Nashville: Fisk University, 1976.
- Harlem Renaissance: Art of Black America, introduction by Mary Schmidt Campbell; essays by David Driskell, David Levering Lewis, and Deborah Willis Ryan, New York: The Studio Museum in Harlem, 1987. ISBN 0-8109-1099-3
- Introspectives: Contemporary Art by Americans and Brazilians of African Descent, curators, Henry J. Drewal and David C. Driskell, Los Angeles: California Afro-American Museum, 1989.
- African American Visual Aesthetics: a Postmodernist View (editor) Washington, D.C.: Smithsonian Institution Press, 1995. ISBN 1-56098-605-0
- The Other Side of Color: African American Art in the Collection of Camille O. and William H. Cosby, Jr., San Francisco: Pomegranate, 2001. ISBN 0-7649-1455-3

== See also ==
- David C. Driskell Center (Arts research center at UMD named for Driskell)
- James A. Porter (Driskell's mentor at Howard University)
- Sylvia Snowden (studied under Driskell)
- Michael Borders (studied under Driskell)
