= A. James Clark =

American business executive and philanthropist (1927–2015)

- Born: Alfred James Clark; December 2, 1927; Richmond, Virginia, US
- Died: March 20, 2015 (aged 87); Easton, Maryland, US
- Education: University of Maryland
- Children: 3

Alfred James Clark (December 2, 1927 – March 20, 2015) was an American engineer, businessman and philanthropist. He was chairman and CEO of Clark Enterprises, Inc., headquartered in Bethesda, Maryland. The company's largest subsidiary is Clark Construction Group, LLC, one of the United States' largest construction companies, founded in 1906 as the George Hyman Construction Company.

== Early life ==
Clark was born on December 2, 1927, in Richmond, Virginia, the son of a life insurance salesman father. He grew up in Bethesda, Maryland.

Clark was a 1950 graduate of the University of Maryland, College Park, where he was a member of Phi Delta Theta.

== Career ==
In 1950, he was hired by the George Hyman Construction Company. In 1969, he became president. In 1977, he formed OMNI Construction, a double-breasted subsidiary.

In addition to being an engineer and business executive, Clark served as a university trustee emeritus at Johns Hopkins University.

== Philanthropy ==
Clark has given to the University of Maryland, College Park's School of Engineering, which now bears his name.

He established the A. James Clark Engineering Scholars program, a program to provide financial aid to engineering and computerscience majors. The program is at 11 institutions and supports 470+ students.

List of A. James Clark Scholars schools
Institution	Since	Notes	Ref.
Duke University			
George Washington University	2011	As part of $8 million donation.	
Georgia Tech	2018		
Johns Hopkins University			
Penn State	2020	As part of $15.5 million donation.	
Stevens Institute of Technology	2018		
University of Maryland	2017	Part of a $219.5 million donation.	
University of Pennsylvania			
University of Virginia			
Vanderbilt University			
Virginia Tech			

He donated $10 million toward the construction of the Johns Hopkins University building, "Clark Hall," which is the cornerstone of the Decker Quadrangle. His construction company served as general contractor for the building, which was named in his honor.

On October 4, 2017, it was announced the University of Maryland would receive almost $220 million from the A. James and Alice B. Clark Foundation.

== Personal life ==
In 1950, Clark married Alice Bratton. They had three children and lived in Vero Beach, Florida. He died of congestive heart failure in 2015.

== Awards and honors ==
- Golden Plate Award of the American Academy of Achievement (1987)
- The University of Maryland honorary doctor of engineering degree, the Distinguished Engineering Alumnus Award, and induction into the University of Maryland Alumni Association's Hall of Fame
