= John D. Anderson =

American curator (born 1937)

John D. Anderson Jr.
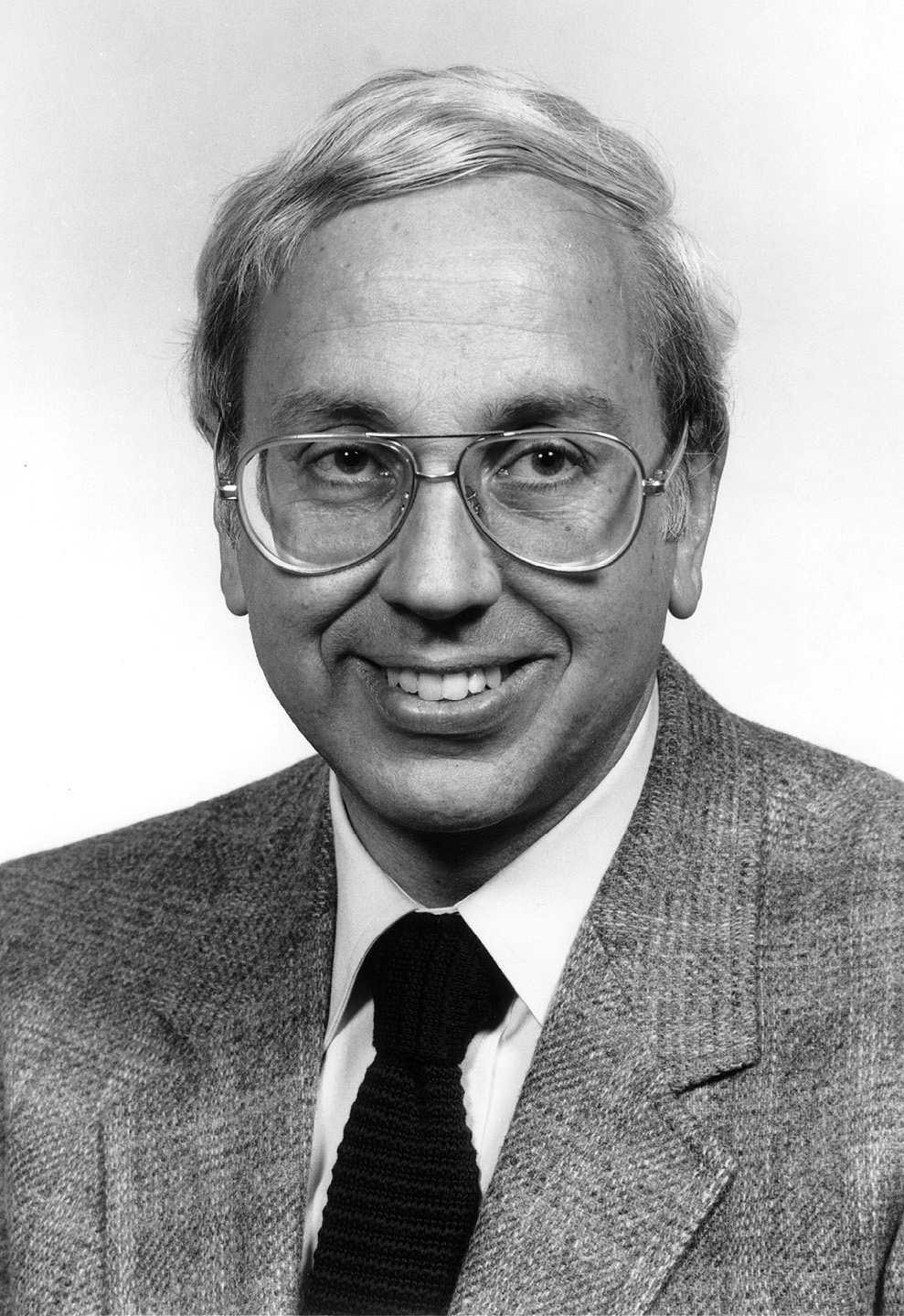
- Born: October 1, 1937 (age 89); Lancaster, Pennsylvania
- Education: University of Florida; Ohio State University
- Known for: Curator of Aerodynamics at the National Air and Space Museum
- Scientific career
- Fields: Aerospace engineering
- Workplaces: Smithsonian Institution

John D. Anderson Jr. (born October 1, 1937) is the Curator of Aerodynamics at the National Air and Space Museum at the Smithsonian Institution in Washington, D.C., professor emeritus in the Department of Aerospace Engineering at the University of Maryland, College Park.

== Biography ==
John D. Anderson Jr. was born on October 1, 1937, in Lancaster, Pennsylvania. He enrolled at the University of Florida in Gainesville in approximately 1953. In 1959, he earned a bachelor's degree in Aeronautical Engineering with high honors. In 1959, he was hired by the United States Air Force to become a Task Scientist at the Aerospace Research Laboratory, Wright-Patterson Air Force Base in Dayton, Ohio. He stayed in that position until 1962, when he enrolled at Ohio State University in Columbus under fellowships from the National Science Foundation and NASA. In 1966, Anderson earned his Ph.D. in Aeronautical and Astronautical Engineering from Ohio State. That same year, he joined the United States Naval Ordnance Laboratory in White Oak, Maryland, becoming the Chief of the Hypersonic Group.

In 1973, Anderson joined the faculty of the University of Maryland, becoming Chairman of the Department of Aerospace Engineering. He became Professor of Aerospace Engineering in 1980, serving in that capacity until 1999, when he retired and was named professor emeritus. He also served as an affiliate member of the History Department at UMD. The John Anderson Scholarship Fund was established in Anderson's honor in 2000 by the A. James Clark School of Engineering jointly with the Department of Aerospace Engineering.

Anderson was elected as a member into the National Academy of Engineering for aerospace engineering and history textbooks and for his contributions to hypersonic gas dynamics.

He is currently the Curator of Aerodynamics at the Smithsonian Institution's National Air and Space Museum.

== Books ==
- Gas Dynamic Lasers: An Introduction, Academic Press (1976), and under McGraw-Hill
- Introduction to Flight, McGraw-Hill, 1st edition (1978), 2nd edition, (1985), 3rd edition (1989), 4th edition (2000), 5th edition (2005), 6th edition (2008), 7th edition (2011), 8th edition (2015), 9th edition (2021)
- Modern Compressible Flow, McGraw-Hill, 1st edition (1982), 2nd edition (1990), 3rd edition (2002)
- Fundamentals of Aerodynamics, 1st edition (1984), 2nd edition (1991), 3rd edition (2001), 4th edition (2006), 5th edition (2010), 6th edition (2017), 7th edition (2023)
- Hypersonic and High Temperature Gas Dynamics, 1st edition (1989), 2nd edition (2000), 2nd revised edition (2006), 3rd edition (2019)
- Computational Fluid Dynamics: The Basics with Applications, McGraw-Hill (1995)
- A History of Aerodynamics and Its Impact on Flying Machines, Cambridge University Press (1997)
- Aircraft Performance and Design, McGraw-Hill (1999)
- The Airplane: A History of Its Technology, American Institute of Aeronautics and Astronautics (2002)
- Inventing Flight: The Wright Brothers and Their Predecessors, Johns Hopkins University Press (2004)
- X-15: The World's Fastest Rocket Plane and the Pilots Who Ushered in the Space Age, Zenith Press (2014)
