= Dagmar R. Henney =

German American mathematician (born 1931)

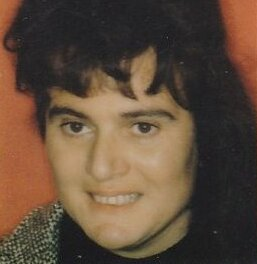
- An early photo of Henney
- Born: Dagmar Renate Kirchner; May 6, 1931 (age 94); Berlin, Germany
- Died: September 16, 2023 (aged 92)
- Occupation: Former professor at George Washington University
- Spouse: Alan Henney

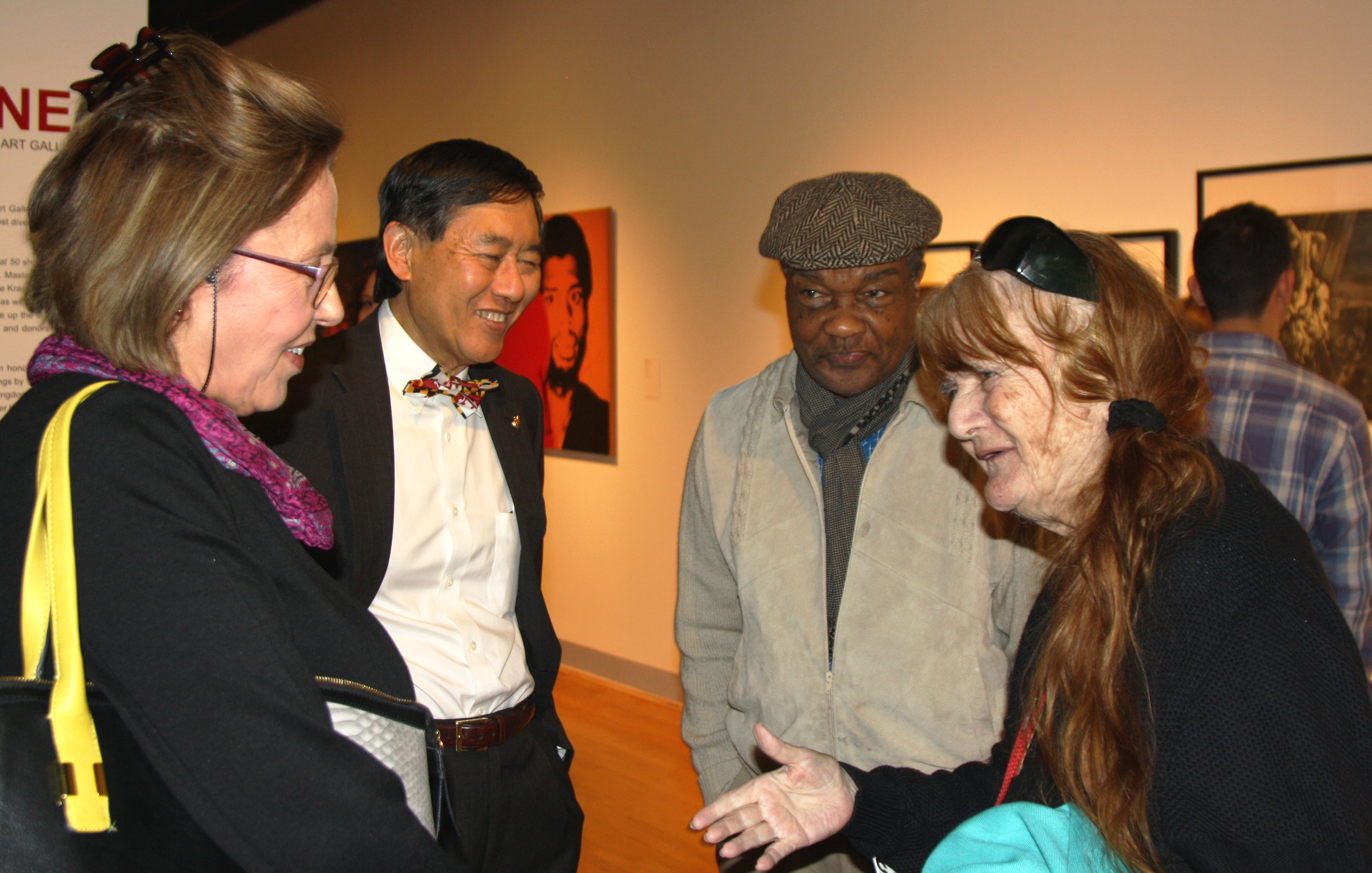
The University of Maryland, College Park Art Gallery celebrated its 50th anniversary on Feb. 24, 2016 with a memorable art exhibition. Among those attending were President Wallace Loh and his wife, Barbara, on the left; and Prof. David C. Driskell, along with Prof. Dagmar Henney, on the right. Photo courtesy University of Maryland Art Gallery, used with permission.

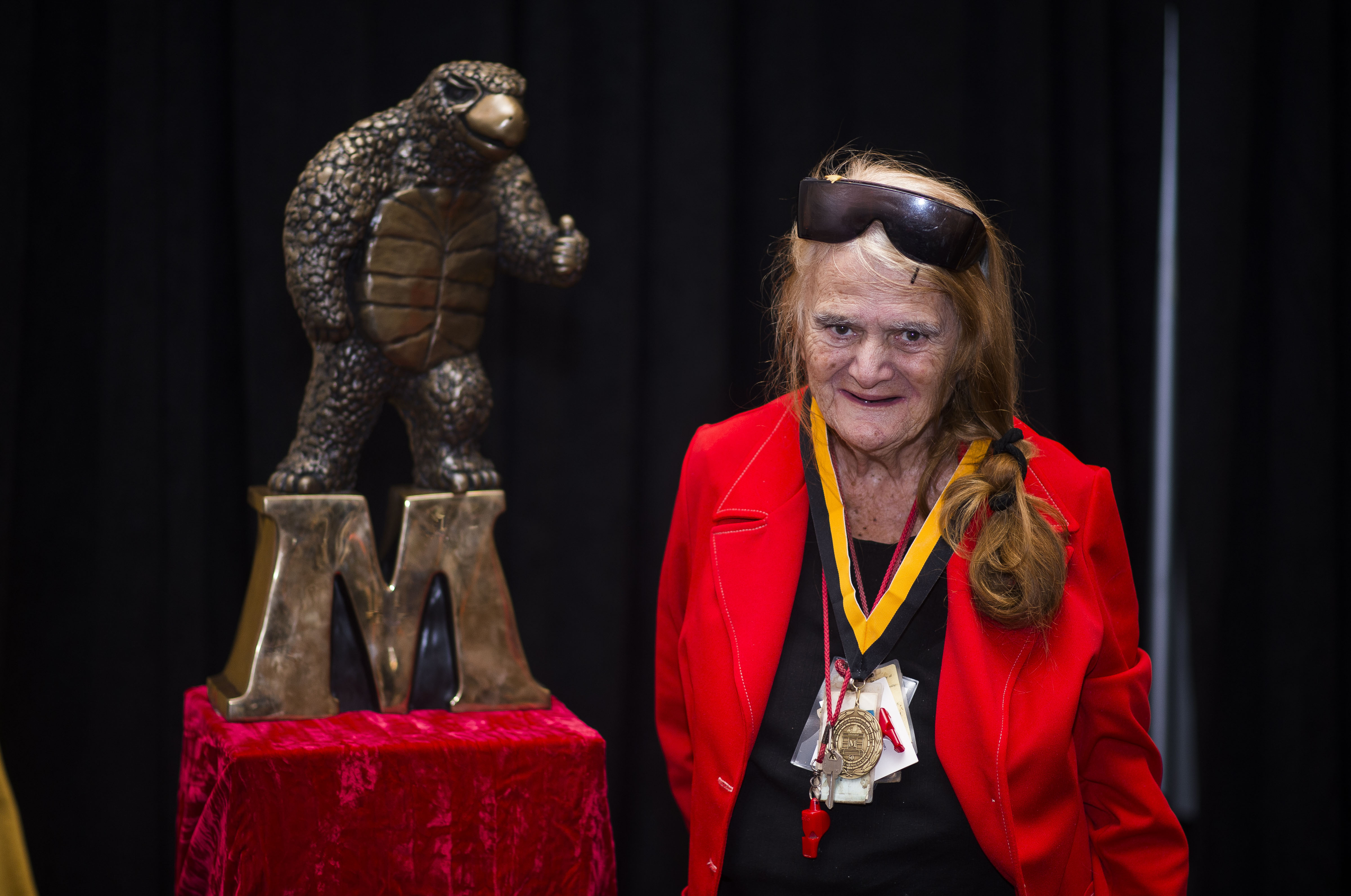
Dr. Dagmar Henney was awarded the 50th Emeritus Alumni Society Medallion on May 18, 2016, at an alumni ceremony prior to the Spring Commencement at the University of Maryland, College Park. Photo courtesy University of Maryland Alumni Association, used with permission.

Dagmar Renate "Reni" Kirchner Henney (May 6, 1931 – September 16, 2023) was a German-born American mathematician and former professor of calculus, finite mathematics, and measure and integration at George Washington University in Washington, DC. She was also known for her contributions to the study of additive set-values and Banach spaces.

== Early life and education ==
Henney was born in Berlin, Germany as Dagmar Renate Kirchner to Albert, a scientist, and Margot Kirchner. Though her father was Catholic, Henney's mother was Jewish, which made her a target of the Nazi Party. During the war, Henney's mother was killed in Auschwitz. Not long after, Henney and her father went on the run; splitting their time between the cities of Berlin and Hamburg to avoid the Nazis and later fleeing from the invading Soviet army. In an interview, Henney recalled that at one point during this period, she found twenty bombshells scattered on her front lawn.

As a Jewish child, Henney was not allowed to enroll in a formal school during the war years. Her father, a scientist, taught her chess and mathematics at home, rewarding her with mathematical problem sets if she won a game.

At age 10, Henney took the admittance exam for admission to the Abitur High School in Hamburg, Germany, from which she would graduate. When recalling one of the questions given to her in the exam, Henney remembered that "there were questions about a frog climbing a flag pole...he'd climb up a few centimeters and then slip back", and that it was her job to "figure how long it would take him to climb the pole."

At the age of 21, Henney moved to the United States in pursuit of a college degree. She had accumulated 63 transferable credits from her high school studies, and was able to matriculate rapidly at the University of Miami in Miami, Florida. She continued to study mathematics, taking classes in nuclear physics and advanced calculus. It was also at this time that she developed a secondary interest in linguistic studies. Henney found a mentor in professor of linguistics Jack Reynolds. She enrolled in classes such as Middle English, Old English, and Chaucer linguistics. In addition to her coursework, Henney took on part-time jobs in Miami. She worked as a movie theater cashier, making 57 cents an hour, and taught classes at the university, teaching up to twelve credits a semester. At the age of 24, three years after she enrolled, Henney graduated from the University of Miami with a Bachelor of Science degree with a major in physics and a minor in mathematics and chemistry, as well as a Master of Science degree in pure mathematics. It was during her freshman year at the University of Miami, Henney met her future husband, Alan G. Henney, in a nuclear physics class.

After graduating from the University of Miami, Henney and her husband moved to Takoma Park, Maryland, in order to allow her husband to accept a position at the Naval Ordnance Laboratory. She began work on her doctorate at the University of Maryland at College Park, where she taught 18 credits of classes and oversaw the departments of off-campus classes. The latter made her responsible for coordinating the hiring and managing of off-campus professors and teaching assistants, as well as making her a liaison with the university's numerous international students. It was during this time that Henney wrote her dissertation "The theory of set-valued additive functions defined on base-cones in Banach spaces with values in the collection of compact, convex sets". The adviser to her dissertation was German Professor Gottfried Köthe, the founding director of the Institute for Applied Mathematics at the University of Heidelberg. She successfully defended her dissertation in 1965. Becoming the first woman to earn a doctorate in pure mathematics from the University of Maryland. Instead of receiving her diploma during the award ceremony, she was handed a blank piece of paper, as she had forgotten to pay the university's graduation fee.

Henney, according to her family tree, has two distant and prominent cousins, German composer Kurt Weill and German expressionist painter and printmaker Ernst Ludwig Kirchner. A second Kurt Weill in her tree is also related but not the famous composer. In addition, Henney's husband's (Alan Henney Sr.) grandfather was General Amos Fries, an important commander in World War I.

== Career ==
{{citation needed span|text=After completing her degree at the University of Maryland, Henney became a professor in the Department of Mathematics at George Washington University, where she taught classes in calculus, finite mathematics, and measure and integration. In addition to the work she performed as a professor, she also served as an adviser to the university's chapters of Pi Mu Epsilon (the National Mathematics Honorary Society), Sigma Xi (The Scientific Research Society), and Phi Beta Kappa.

=== Research ===
While developing her thesis, in 1962 Henney researched and published such projects as "Set-Valued Quadratic Functionals" and "One-Parameter Semigroups". Henney also published eight research papers in journals in Europe, Asia and the United States. She is the author of Properties of Set Valued Additive Functions, which serves to "examine certain properties of set-valued additive functions which are defined on the positive cone in Euclidean space"; and best-selling title, Unsolved Questions in Mathematics. In addition to publishing her own research, Henney has experience in editing, including her work in Open Questions in Mathematics, which explores the work of significant scientists and Nobel Prize winners from around the globe. Henney gives credit to Portuguese, German, and Scandinavian mathematicians in her research, as she used their findings to further develop theoretical problems and research which she published in American scholarly journals.

=== Honors and distinctions ===
Henney's accomplishments have made her the recipient of several distinguished honors, ranging from her membership in Phi Beta Kappa to her distinction as a member of both Who's Who of American Women and The World's Who's Who. Henney was the first female student to receive a scholarship to the University of Miami from B'nai B'rith. She was also admitted into the National Association of Science Writers. In addition to being a finalist for the Congressional Scientist Fellows program, Henney was also a candidate for the Congressional Scientist Program, which serves to connect Capitol Hill with the scientific community at large. Additionally, Johns Hopkins University honored Henney's work at the Conference of Conjugate Duality.

== Personal life ==
In 1956, Henney became a naturalized citizen of the United States of America.

Henney was widowed and remained a resident of the Washington, DC, metropolitan area until her death in 2023.
