= Darryll Pines =

American aerospace engineer and academic administrator

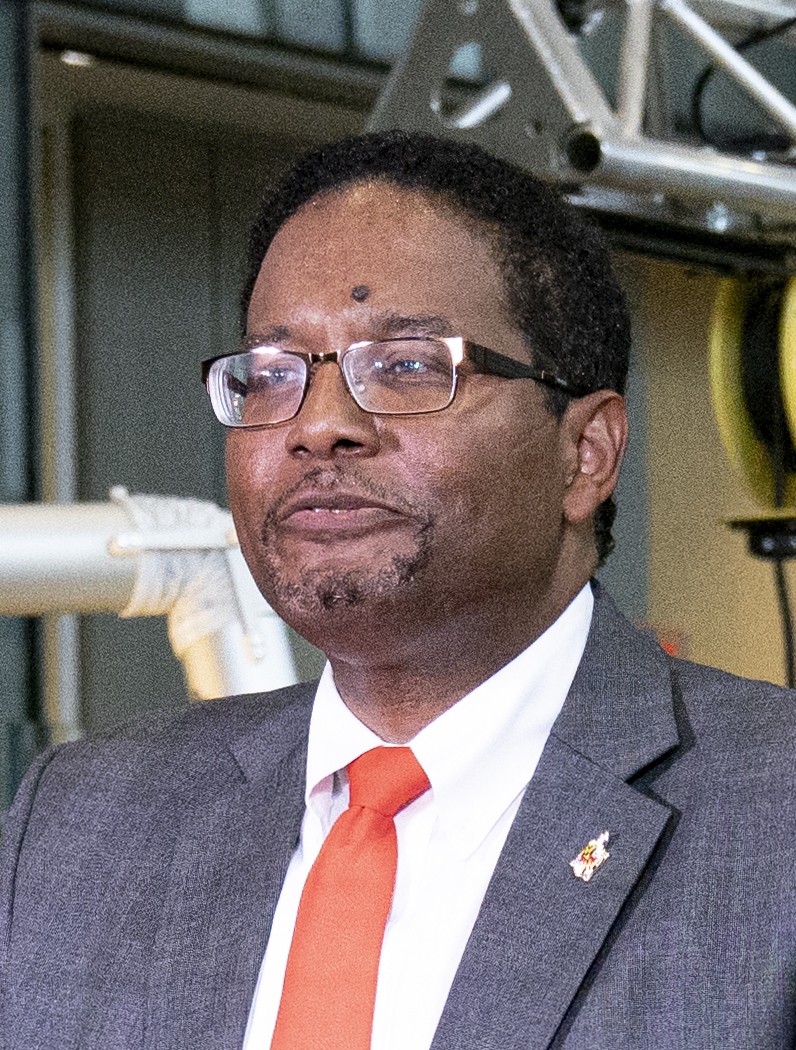
- Pines in 2021

34th President of the University of Maryland, College Park
- Incumbent
- Assumed office July 1, 2020
- Preceded by: Wallace Loh

Personal details
- Born: Darryll John Pines; August 28, 1964 (age 62) Oakland, California, U.S.
- Children: Donovan
- Education: University of California, Berkeley (BS); Massachusetts Institute of Technology (MS, PhD)

Darryll John Pines is an American aerospace engineer and academic administrator currently serving as president of University of Maryland, College Park. He was previously dean of the A. James Clark School of Engineering and held the Glenn L. Martin professorship of aerospace engineering.

== Early life and education ==
Darryll John Pines was born in Oakland, California, on August 28, 1964. He completed a B.S. in mechanical engineering at University of California, Berkeley. Pines earned an M.S. (1988) and Ph.D. (1992) in mechanical engineering from the Massachusetts Institute of Technology.

== Career ==
In 1995, Pines joined the faculty of University of Maryland, College Park (UMD), as an assistant professor. He served as dean of the A. James Clark School of Engineering for 11 years and held the Glenn L. Martin professorship of aerospace engineering. Pines assumed the presidency on July 1, 2020, succeeding President Wallace Loh.

== Alleged Plagiarism ==
In 2024, the University of Maryland announced it was conducting a review of potential plagiarism by Pines, following an article published by the Daily Wire alleging that two papers written by Pines and a co-author in 2002 and 2006 plagiarized 1,500 words from a tutorial website. The university later cleared its own president, but refused to make the report on Pines's publications accessible to the public.

== Awards and honors ==
Pines was elected a member of the National Academy of Engineering in 2019 for inspirational leadership and contributions to engineering education excellence in the United States.

== Personal life ==
Pines' son Donovan Pines played for the Maryland Terrapins men's soccer team and is currently a professional soccer player.
