= Michael Borders =

African-American artist

Michael Borders (born 1946) is an African American artist from Hartford, Connecticut, who is noted for his murals. Borders received a Bachelor's Degree from Fisk University and a Masters in Fine Art from Howard University. He studied under David Driskell and did a summer residency at the Skowhegan School of Painting and Sculpture in Maine. Borders has said that large-scale murals are the most effective way for him to convey important messages to many people.

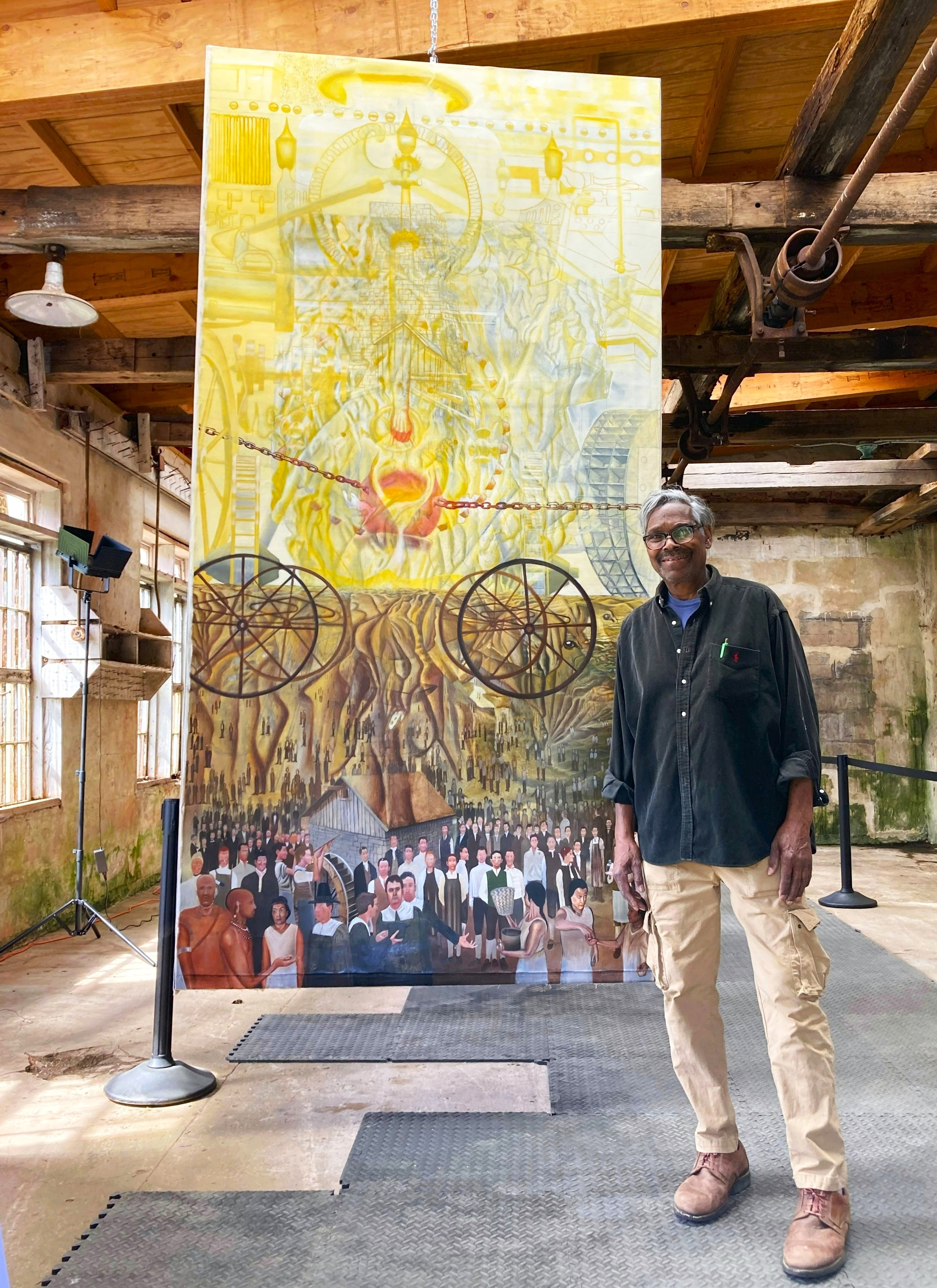
Michael Borders at an exhibition of his multi-panel mural, Panorama of Connecticut Industry (May 2025)

One of Borders' most prominent works is an 8-panel mural titled Panorama of Connecticut Industry, which depicts the interplay of natural, human, and manufacturing history of Connecticut from the 1600s through modern times. Each panel in the mural represents a different Connecticut county, showcasing that county's particular industrial specialization and historic figures. Borders has said that the mural was inspired by his world travels in the mid-1970s, which helped him to see Connecticut's marketplace in a new way. He has described the work as "a documentary mural." Although each panel is 10 feet high and 5 feet wide, it is portable and has been displayed in various locations throughout Connecticut. It is designed to be configured in multiple ways -- as individual panels, as one flat contiguous 40-foot wide image, or in an octagon shape that people can walk all the way around.

Borders' mural titled The Genesis of the Capital City was installed on a building on Trumbull Street in Hartford in 1973, but only lasted there for a few years; the mural was destroyed when the building was demolished in 1978. The 68 foot tall by 110 foot wide mural showed the gold dome of the state capital building being lifted into the sky by three blue-green hands, with well-known Hartford landmarks (the Colt Armory dome and the Travelers tower) and a natural landscape in the background. Approximately 10 years after The Genesis of the Capital City was destroyed, the Connecticut legislature passed an Act Concerning Art Preservation and Artists' Rights. For works of art valued at $2,500 or more, the law preserves the right of the artist to intervene to prevent the destruction or defacement of their artwork, even if the artist no longer owns it.

Another of Borders' Hartford murals, Children, was completed in the late 1990s with help from children attending a summer art camp in the city. As of 2025, that 15 foot tall by 85 foot wide mural is still visible on the eastern wall of a building located at the intersection of Main Street and Albany Avenue.
