= C. Daniel Mote Jr. =

American mechanical engineer (born 1937)

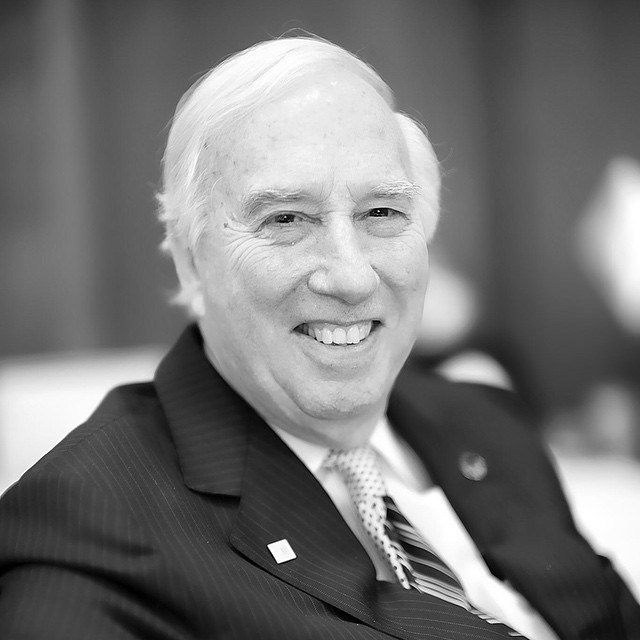
- Dr. C. Daniel Mote (2015)

President of the University of Maryland, College Park
- In office September 1998 – August 2010
- Preceded by: William English Kirwan
- Succeeded by: Wallace Loh

Personal details
- Born: February 5, 1937 (age 89) San Francisco, California, U.S.
- Education: University of California, Berkeley
- Profession: Professor, university administrator, academic

Clayton Daniel Mote Jr. (born February 5, 1937) is the President Emeritus of the National Academy of Engineering. He served as the president of the NAE from July 2013 to June 2019. He also served as President of the University of Maryland, College Park from September 1998 until August 2010. From 1967 to 1991, Mote was a professor in mechanical engineering at the University of California, Berkeley, and served as Vice Chancellor for University Relations at Berkeley from 1991 to 1998. Mote is a judge for the Queen Elizabeth Prize for Engineering.

== Academic career ==
=== University of California, Berkeley ===
Mote was born in San Francisco, California and received his bachelor's degree, masters, and doctorate degrees from the University of California, Berkeley in mechanical engineering. After a postdoctoral year in England and three years as an assistant professor at the Carnegie Institute of Technology in Pittsburgh, he returned to Berkeley to join the faculty in mechanical engineering for the next 31 years. He and his students investigated the dynamics, stability, and control of high-speed rotating and translating continua (e.g., disks, webs, tapes, and cables) as well as biomechanical problems emanating from snow skiing. He coined the area called "dynamics of axially moving materials" encompassing these systems. He has authored or co-authored over 300 academic publications, and has mentored 58 Ph.D. students. At Berkeley, he held an endowed chair in mechanical systems and served as chair of the mechanical engineering department from 1987 to 1991 when the National Research Council (NRC) ranked its graduate program effectiveness highest nationally. Because of his success at raising funds for mechanical engineering, in 1991 he was appointed vice chancellor at Berkeley expressly to create and lead a $1 billion capital campaign for the campus that ultimately reached $1.4 billion.

=== University of Maryland ===
In 1998, Dr. Mote was recruited to the presidency of the University of Maryland, College Park, a position he held until 2010 when he was appointed Regents Professor. His goal for the university was to elevate its self-expectation of achievement and its national and global position through proactive initiatives. During his tenure the number of Academy members among the faculty tripled, three Nobel laureates were recognized, and an accredited school of public health and a new department of bioengineering were created. He also founded a 130-acre research park next to the campus, faculty research funds increased by 150%, and partnerships with surrounding federal agencies and with international organizations expanded greatly. The number of students studying abroad tripled, and he created an annual open house day that has attracted over 100,000 visitors on that day, founded a charitable foundation for the campus whose board of trustees launched a $1 billion capital campaign that reached its goal, increased the graduation rate of all students in six year by 15-20% during his tenure and took every student to lunch that wanted to go. The Academic Ranking of World Universities ranked the campus #36 in 2010 and its Engineering School #13 globally.

=== National Academy of Engineering ===
Mote was elected a member of the National Academy of Engineering in 1988 for analysis of the mechanics of complex dynamic systems, providing results of great practical importance in vibrations and biomechanics. He was also elected to the positions of Councillor (2002-2008), Treasurer (2009-2013), and President for six years beginning July 1, 2013. He serves as vice chair of the National Research Council (NRC) and has served on its Governing Board Executive Committee since 2009. He chaired the NRC Committee on Global Science and Technology Strategies and Their Effects on US National Security (2009-2010), co-chaired the National Academies Government-University-Industry Research Roundtable (2007-2013), and co-chaired the Committee on Science, Technology, Engineering, and Mathematics Workforce Needs for the US Department of Defense and the US Industrial Base (2011-2012). He also served as vice chair of the NRC Committee on the Department of Defense Basic Research (2004) and on the NRC committee authoring the Rising Above the Gathering Storm reports of 2005 and 2010. He was also a founding member of the FBI's National Security Higher Education Advisory Board (2005-2010).

== Awards and memberships ==
Mote has received numerous distinctions throughout his career:

- Humboldt Prize from the Federal Republic of Germany.
- Berkeley Citation, an award similar to the honorary doctorate, from the University of California, Berkeley.
- University of California, Berkeley Distinguished Teaching Award
- University of California, Alumni Association Excellence in Achievement Award
- Distinguished Engineering Alumnus from the University of California, Berkeley.
- Member of the U.S. National Academy of Engineering.
- Member of the American Academy of Arts and Sciences.
- Honorary Membership and Fellow of the American Society of Mechanical Engineers International.
- Fellow of the International Academy of Wood Science.
- Fellow of Acoustical Society of America.
- Fellow of American Association for the Advancement of Science.
- Fellow of the American Academy of Mechanics.
- 2005 J. P. Den Hartog Award from the ASME International Technical Committee on Vibration and Sound to honor his lifelong contribution to the teaching and/or practice of vibration engineering.
- 2005 Founders Award from the National Academy of Engineering honoring an Academy member who has upheld the ideals and principles of the Academy through achievements.
- 2011 ASME Medal from the American Society of Mechanical Engineers.
- Holder of four honorary doctorates and two honorary professorships
- 2020 Benjamin Franklin Medal (Franklin Institute).
- Honorary member of Academia Sinica (2016).
