= Clark Construction =

American construction firm

Coordinates: 38.905611°N 77.047412°W

Clark Construction Group, LLC
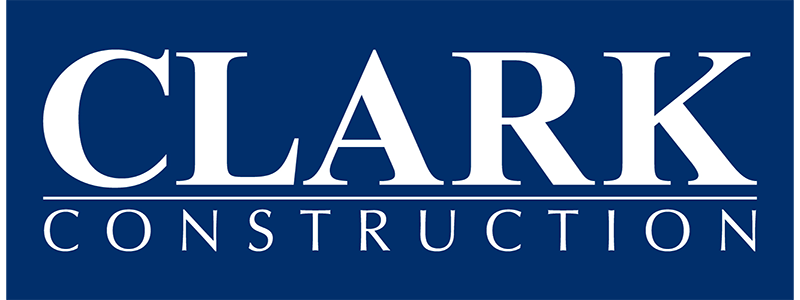
- Type: Private
- Industry: Construction
- Founded: 1906; 120 years ago
- Founder: George Hyman
- Headquarters: McLean, Virginia, U.S.
- Key people: Robert D. Moser, Jr., president and chief executive officer; A. James Clark
- Services: General Contractor; Construction Manager; Design-Build
- Revenue: $6.5 billion (2022)
- Number of employees: 4,200
- Subsidiaries: Clark Construction; Guy F. Atkinson Construction; Shirley Contracting Company; C3M Power Systems; Clark Civil; Clark Concrete; Clark Foundations; Clark Water; Align Capital Solutions; Altura; Carta; Coda; Edgemoor Infrastructure & Real Estate; Fractile Studio; S2N Technology Group
- Website: www.clarkgroup.com

Clark Construction Group, LLC is an American construction firm headquartered in McLean, Virginia, and founded in 1906. The company had 2018 annual revenue of more than $5 billion, and is one of the largest commercial and civil contractors in the country. Some projects include Capital One Arena and L'Enfant Plaza.

== History ==
The company traces its founding to the George Hyman Construction Company, an excavating company, in 1906. Business boomed, as it initially had the only steam shovel in Washington. The company began doing construction work in 1923; its first such contract was with Wheatley Junior High School. The company was involved in numerous military construction projects during World War II.

Hyman died in 1970 and was succeeded by his nephew Benjamin Rome.

In 1969, A. James Clark bought the company from the Hyman family and oversaw major growth including one of its earliest projects L'Enfant Plaza in Washington. Clark formed a separate company in 1977 for non-union projects in the Washington area (Hyman legally could not bid on such projects). In 1995, Clark merged construction companies of Hyman, Shirley Contracting Company, Guy F. Atkinson Construction and OMNI to form Clark Construction.

In 2016, a year after Clark died, firm management bought the company from its parent Clark Enterprises, leaving the parent to concentrate on its private equity, financial and real estate markets.

In 2025, Clark Construction was awarded a $200M contract by the Trump administration, in conjunction with AECOM and McCrery Architects, to build a 90,000 square feet (8,400 m^{2}) state ballroom, which would include demolition/modification of part of the East Wing of the White House.

== Subsidiaries ==
- Building & Infrastructure Group:
  - Clark Construction - general contractor
  - Guy F. Atkinson Construction - a heavy civil contractor
  - Shirley Contracting Company - a transportation, heavy civil, and site contractor
  - C3M Power Systems - a transportation systems and electrical contractor
  - Clark Civil - a heavy civil contractor
  - Clark Concrete - self perform concrete contractor
  - Clark Foundations - engineering solutions for excavation support systems
  - Clark Water - specializes in water and wastewater projects
- Asset Solutions Group:
  - Align Capital Solutions - financing partner
  - Altura - building commissioning and smart building consulting services
  - Carta - project advisor
  - Coda - construction software development and engineering
  - Edgemoor Infrastructure & Real Estate - a developer and asset manager of public buildings and infrastructure
  - Fractile Studio - BIM and VDC engineering services
  - S2N Technology Group - technology solutions design, consulting, and project management services
