= List of presidents of the University of Maryland, College Park =

The president of the University of Maryland, College Park manages the day-to-day operations of the University of Maryland, College Park. The president is expected to work cooperatively with the University Senate and the University System of Maryland Board of Regents to effectively manage the university.

== List of presidents of the University of Maryland ==
The following persons have served as president of the University of Maryland, College Park:

No.	Image	President	Term start	Term end	Ref.
Presidents of Maryland Agricultural College (1856–1916)
1		Benjamin Hallowell	October 4, 1859	November 1859	
acting		Charles Benedict Calvert	1859	1860	
elected (Note: Elected, but never served.)		John Work Scott	(elected 1860)		
2		John M. Colby	1860	1861	
3		Henry Onderdonk	1861	1864	
acting		Nicholas Worthington	1864	1867	
elected		George Washington Custis Lee	(elected 1866)		
4		Charles Minor	1867	1868	
5		Franklin Buchanan	1868	1869	
6		Samuel Register	1869	1873	
7		Samuel Jones	1873	1875	
8		William H. Parker	1875	1882	
9		Augustine Smith	1883	1887	
acting		Allen Dodge	1887	1888	
10		Henry Alvord	1888	1892	
11		Richard W. Silvester	1892	1912	
acting		Thomas H. Spence	1912	1913	
12		Harry J. Patterson	1913	1917	
Presidents of Maryland State College (1916–1920)
13		Albert F. Woods	1917	1926	
Presidents of University of Maryland (1920–1970)
14		Raymond Pearson	1926	1935	
15		Harry Clifton "Curley" Byrd	1935	1954	
acting		Thomas B. Symons	1954	1954	
16		Wilson Homer "Bull" Elkins	1954	1970 (Note: Elkins continued to serve as president of the 5 campus University of Maryland network from 1970 until 1978 while the College Park campus was being managed by a chancellor.)	
Chancellors of the University of Maryland (1970–1988)
17		Charles E. Bishop	1970	1974 (Note: Resigned to lead the University of Arkansas.)	
acting		John W. Dorsey	August 16, 1974	June 30, 1975	
18		Robert Gluckstern	July 1, 1975	June 30, 1982	
acting		William Kirwan	July 1, 1982	November 1, 1982	
19		John B. Slaughter	November 2, 1982	July 31, 1988 (Note: Resigned to lead Occidental College.)	
Presidents of the University of Maryland, College Park (1988–present)
acting		William Kirwan	August 1, 1988	February 1, 1989	
20		William Kirwan	February 1, 1989	June 30, 1998 (Note: Resigned to lead Ohio State University.)	
acting		Gregory L. Geoffroy	July 1, 1998	August 31, 1998	
21		C. Daniel Mote Jr.	September 1, 1998	August 31, 2010	
acting		Nariman Farvardin (Note: provost)	September 1, 2010	October 31, 2010	
22		Wallace Loh	November 1, 2010	June 30, 2020	
23		Darryll J. Pines	July 1, 2020	present	

Table notes:
