= Wallace Loh =

Chinese-born Peruvian–American academic administrator (born 1946)

Wallace Dao-kui Loh
- 陸道逵
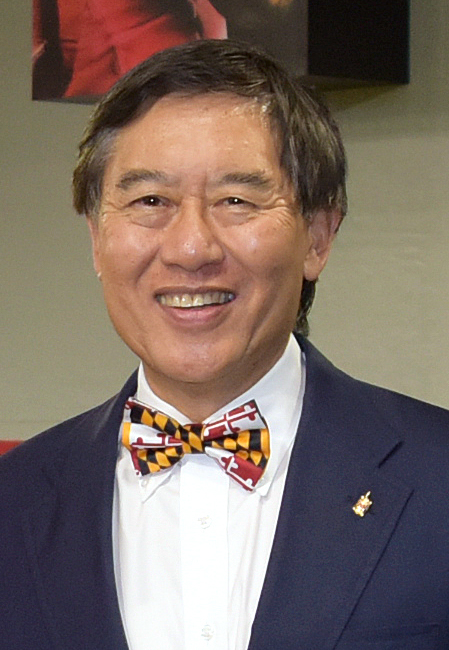

33rd President of the University of Maryland, College Park
- In office November 1, 2010 – June 30, 2020
- Preceded by: C. Daniel Mote Jr.
- Succeeded by: Darryll Pines

Personal details
- Born: 1946 (age 79–80) Shanghai, China
- Education: Grinnell College (BA); Cornell University (MA); University of Michigan (PhD); Yale University (JD)

Wallace Loh
- Traditional Chinese: 陸道逵
- Simplified Chinese: 陆道逵
Transcriptions
Standard Mandarin
- Hanyu Pinyin: Lù Dàokuí

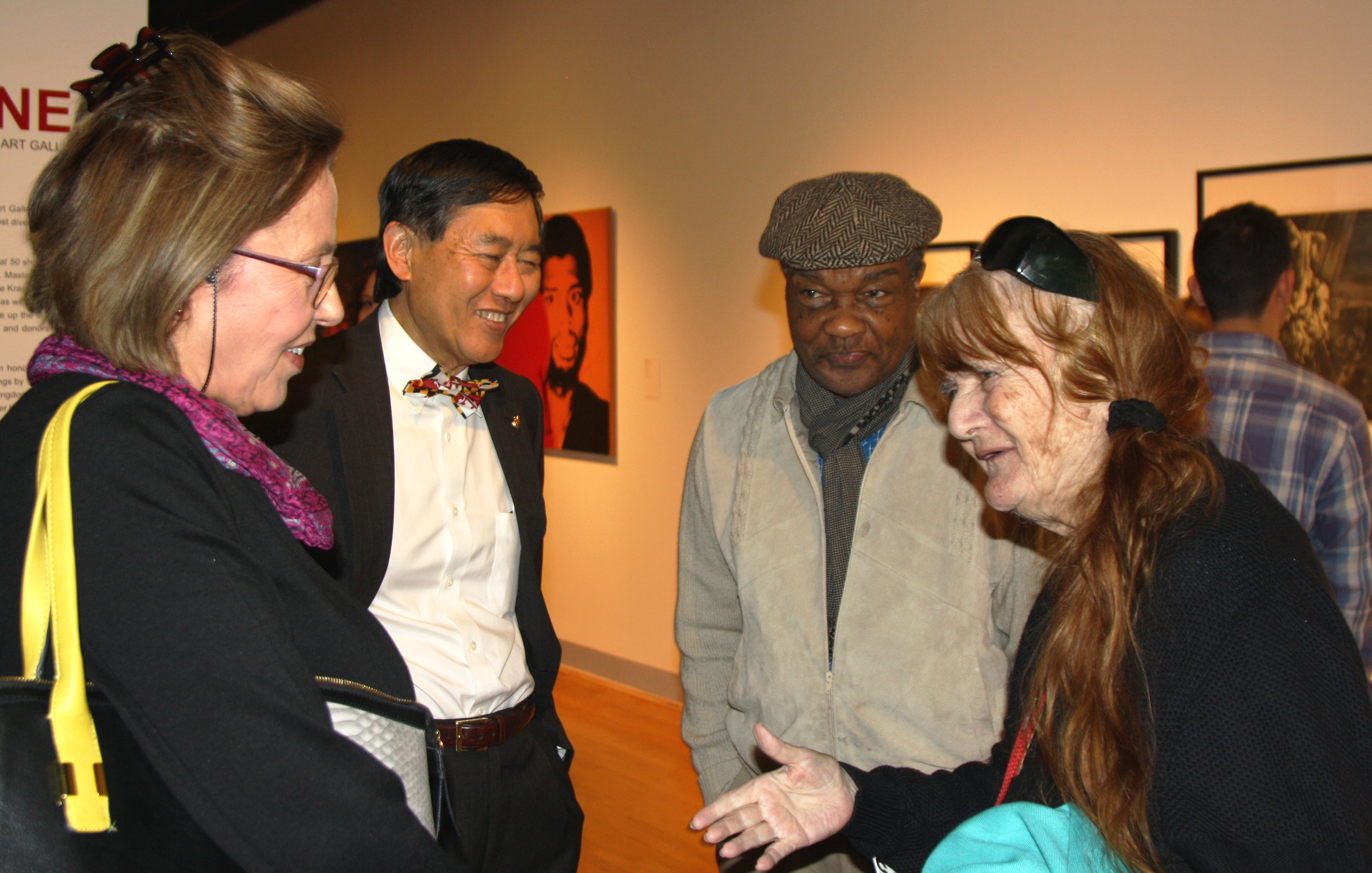
The University of Maryland, College Park Art Gallery celebrated its 50th anniversary on February 24, 2016 with a memorable art exhibition. Among those attending were President Wallace Loh and his wife, Barbara, on the left; and Prof. David Driskell, along with Prof. Dagmar R. Henney, on the right. Photo courtesy University of Maryland Art Gallery, used with permission.

Wallace Dao-kui Loh (Chinese: 陸道逵; pinyin: Lù Dàokuí; born 1946) is an American university administrator. He was the president of the University of Maryland, College Park, from 2010 until 2020.

== Early life and education ==
Loh was born in Shanghai to a prominent family. His grandparents owned five blocks' worth of downtown Shanghai property, and his father was a diplomat. In 1949, when Mao Zedong took over China after the Communist Revolution, the Loh family sought asylum in Lima, Peru. He went to the United States for college, earning a bachelor's degree from Grinnell College. He later earned a master's degree from Cornell where he was elected for membership in the Telluride House, a Ph.D. degree in psychology from the University of Michigan, and a J.D. degree from Yale Law School.

== Academic career ==
Before becoming the president at University of Maryland, College Park, Loh spent three decades in higher education. He has been dean of the University of Washington Law School, vice chancellor of the University of Colorado, a dean at Seattle University, and most recently provost at the University of Iowa where he oversaw budgets and personnel for the state university's eleven colleges.

During his career in academic administration, Loh has led campaigns to curb underage drinking at University of Iowa, and more recently, to diversify the University of Washington Law School.

During his time as president, the university saw a 13.8% increase in underrepresented minority graduation rates and a decrease in the gap between white and underrepresented minority students of 6.1%. He wrote an editorial in Time magazine discussing the importance of an open dialogue on cultural differences between the student population. He also participated in the planning and development of a memorial square to Frederick Douglass to honor his contributions to America's quest for freedom, liberty, and equal rights.

Loh was inducted into Omicron Delta Kappa as a faculty/staff initiate at the University of Maryland in 2011.

In 2018, he endured a personnel scandal related to the death of a football player, Jordan McNair. Loh announced on October 30, 2018, that he would retire as president of the University of Maryland on June 30, 2019, following a detailed investigation into McNair's death. The following day, October 31, Loh fired D. J. Durkin against the desire of the University's Board of Regents, which voted to retain Durkin as head football coach. In response to Lo's resignation, many state lawmakers gave open support to his decisions against the board and expressed a desire to see him continue longer as president.

On January 30, 2019, Loh moved his retirement date from June 2019 to June 2020 due to the university's lack of a ready replacement.

== Awards and memberships ==
- Fellow of the American Academy of Arts and Sciences
- Board of directors of American Council of Education
- Advisory Board of Comptroller General of the United States
- Recipient of American Immigration Council's 16th annual Immigrant Achievement Award

Academic offices
Preceded by C. Daniel Mote Jr.	President of the University of Maryland, College Park; 2010 – 2020	Succeeded by Darryll Pines
