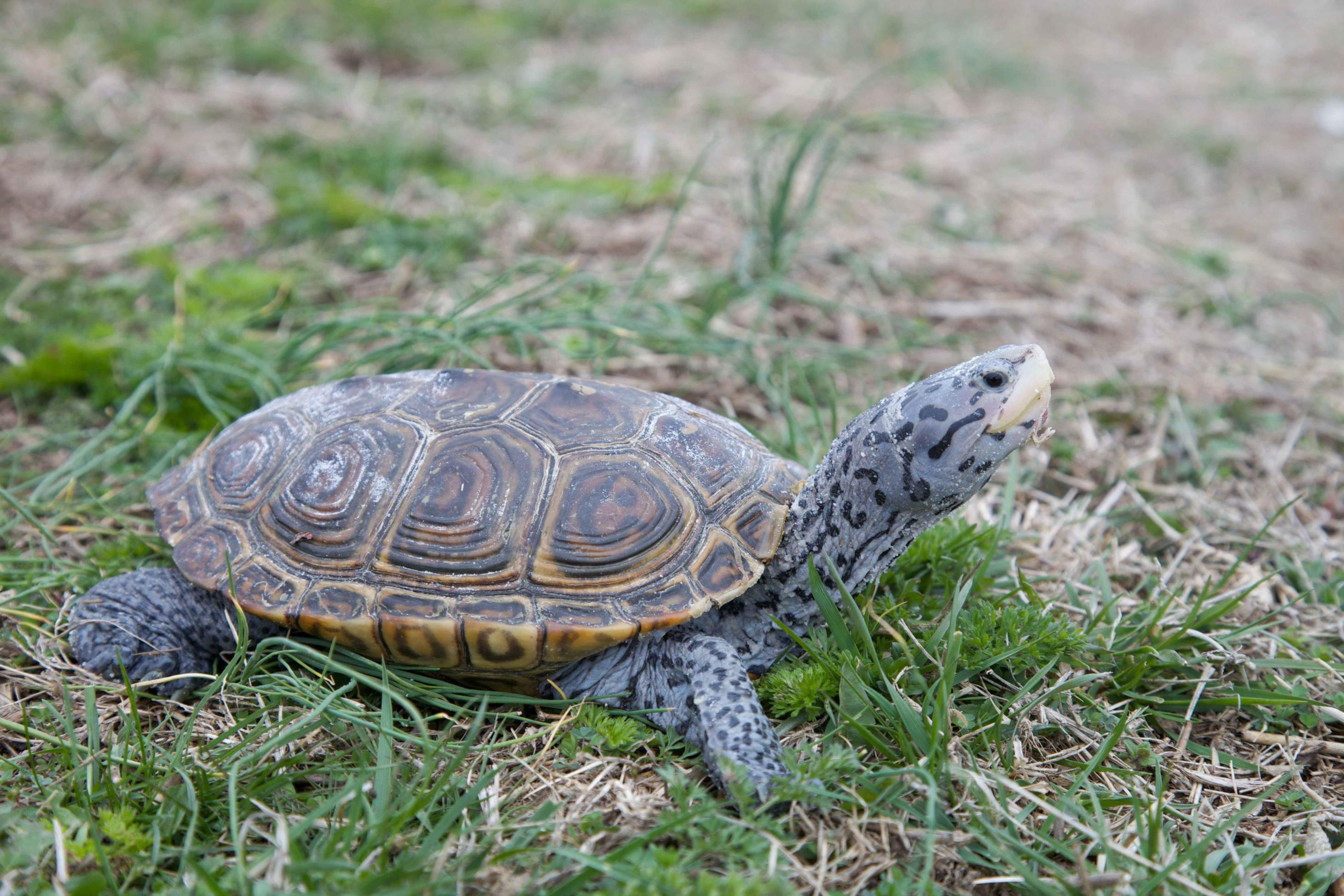
- Photographed in the wild

Conservation status
- Vulnerable (IUCN 3.1)
- CITES Appendix II

Scientific classification
- Kingdom: Animalia
- Phylum: Chordata
- Class: Reptilia
- Order: Testudines
- Suborder: Cryptodira
- Family: Emydidae
- Genus: Malaclemys; Gray, 1844
- Species: M. terrapin

Binomial name
- Malaclemys terrapin (Schoepff, 1793)

Synonyms
- List: Malaclemys terrapin terrapin; Testudo terrapin Schoepff, 1793; Testudo concentrica Shaw, 1802; Testudo ocellata Link, 1807; Testudo concentrata Kuhl, 1820 (ex errore); Emys concentrica Gray, 1831 (Duméril & Bibron, 1830); Testudo concentrica var polita Gray, 1831; Emys terrapin Holbrook, 1842; Emys macrocephalus Gray,1844; Malaclemys concentrica Gray, 1844 (1863); Emys macrocephala LeConte,1854; Emys terrapene LeConte,1856 (ex errore); Clemmys terrapin Strauch, 1862; Malaclemmys concentrica Gray, 1870; Malacoclemmys terrapen Boulenger, 1889 (ex errore); Malaclemys centrata concentrica Cochran, 1932; Malaclemys terrapin Bangs, 1896; Malaclemmys centrata concentrica Hay, 1904; Malaclemys terrapin terrapin Lindholm, 1929; Malaclemys terrapene Stephens & Wiens, 2003; Malaclemys terrapin centrata; Testudo centrata Latreille, 1801; Emys centrata Schweigger, 1812; Emys concentrica var livida Gray, 1831; Clemmys (Clemmys) centrata Fitzinger, 1835; Malaclemmys centrata Lönnberg, 1894; Malaclemmys terrapin centrata Mittleman, 1944; Malaclemys terrapin centrata Mittleman, 1945; Malaclemys terrapin centra Highfield, 1996 (ex errore); Malaclemys terrapin littoralis; Malaclemmys littoralis Hay, 1904; Malaclemys centrata littoralis Siebenrock, 1909; Malaclemys pileata littoralis Stejneger & Barbour, 1917; Malaclemys terrapin littoralis Lindholm, 1929; Malaclemys terrapin macrospilota; Malaclemmys macrospilota Hay, 1904; Malaclemys centrata macrospilota Siebenrock, 1909; Malaclemys pileata macrospilota Stejneger & Barbour, 1917; Malaclemys terrapin macrospilota Lindholm, 1929; Malaclemys terrapin pileata; Emys pileata Wied, 1865; Malaclemmys pileata Hay, 1904; Malaclemys centrata pileata Siebenrock, 1909; Malaclemys pileata pileata Stejneger & Barbour, 1917; Malaclemys terrapin pileata Lindholm, 1929; Malaclemys terrapin rhizophorarum; Malaclemys tuberculifera Gray, 1844 (nomen oblitum); Malaclemmys littoralis rhizophorarum Fowler, 1906 (nomen protectum); Malaclemmys terrapin rhizophorarum Carr, 1946; Malaclemys terrapin rhizophorarum Carr, 1952; Malaclemys terrapin rhizophararum Anderson, 1985 (ex errore); Malaclemys terrapin tequesta; Malaclemys terrapin tequesta Schwartz, 1955

= Diamondback terrapin =

Species of reptile

The diamondback terrapin or simply terrapin (Malaclemys terrapin) is a species of terrapin native to the brackish coastal tidal marshes of the East Coast of the United States and the Gulf of Mexico coast, as well as in Bermuda. It belongs to the monotypic genus Malaclemys. It has one of the largest ranges of all turtles in North America, stretching as far south as the Florida Keys and as far north as Cape Cod.

The name "terrapin" is derived from the Algonquian word torope. It applies to Malaclemys terrapin in both British English and American English. The name originally was used by early European settlers in North America to describe these brackish-water turtles that inhabited neither freshwater habitats nor the sea. It retains this primary meaning in American English. In British English, however, other semi-aquatic turtle species, such as the red-eared slider, might also be called terrapins.

== Description ==
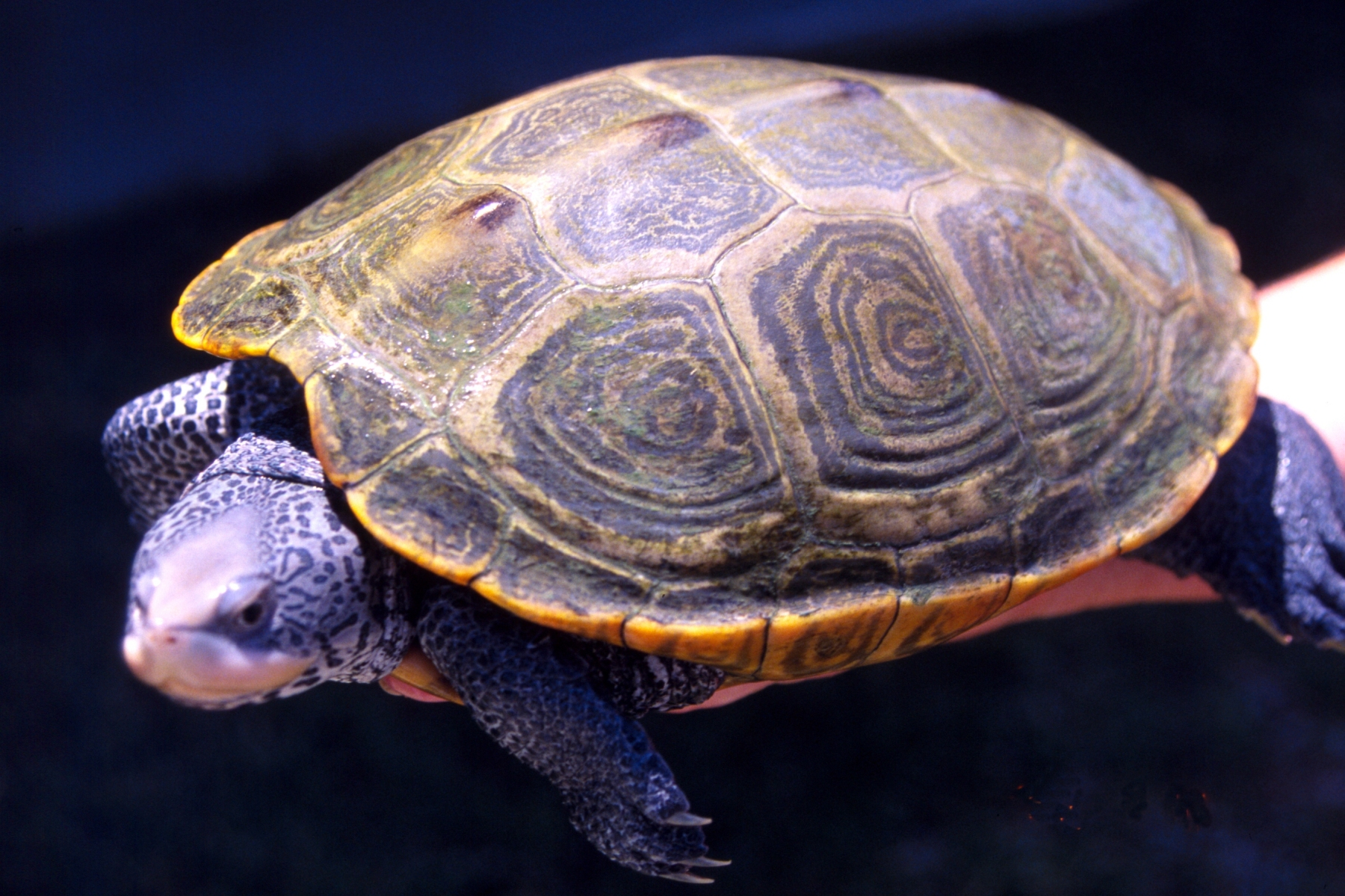
Adult female

The common name refers to the diamond pattern on top of its shell (carapace), but the overall pattern and coloration vary greatly. No two diamondback terrapins look alike. The carapace is usually wider at the back than in the front, has a more or less pronounced central ridge running lengthwise, and from above it appears somewhat wedge- or kite-shaped. The carapace coloring can vary from brown to grey, with a lighter plastron (belly shell), and its body color can be grey, brown, yellow, or white. Almost all have a unique pattern of wiggly, black markings or spots on their body and head. The diamondback terrapin has large webbed feet. The species is sexually dimorphic in that the males grow to a carapace length of approximately 13 cm (5 in), while the females grow to an average carapace length of around 19 cm (7 1/2 in), though they are capable of growing larger. The largest female on record was just over 23 cm (9 in) in carapace length. Specimens from regions that are consistently warmer in temperature tend to be larger than those from cooler, more northern areas. Male diamondback terrapins weigh 300 g (11 oz) on average, while females weigh around 500 g (18 oz). The largest females can weigh up to 1 kg (35 oz).

Diamondback terrapins can live up to 40 years in captivity, but scientists estimate they typically live for about 25 years in the wild.

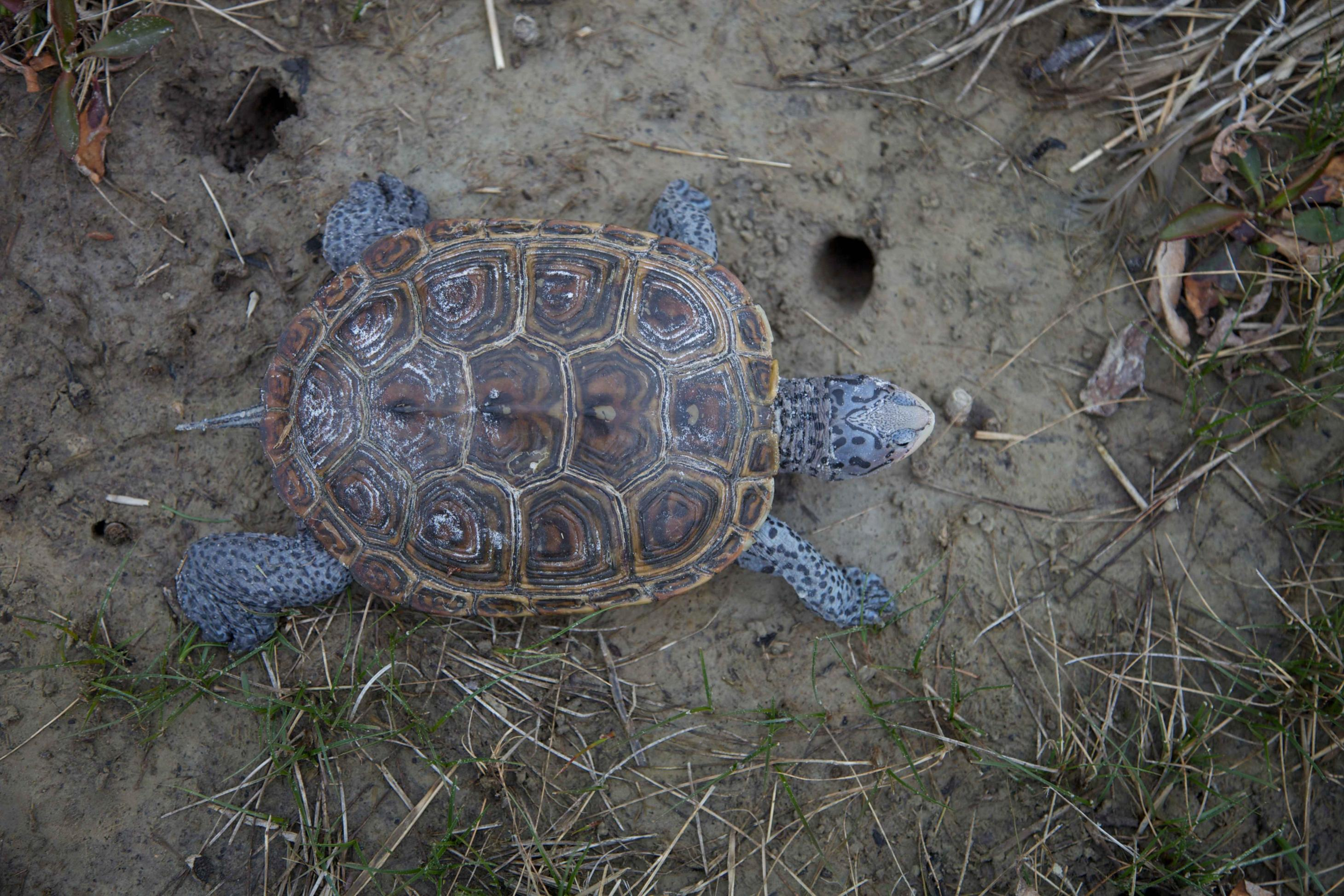
The "diamond" pattern of the terrapin's back

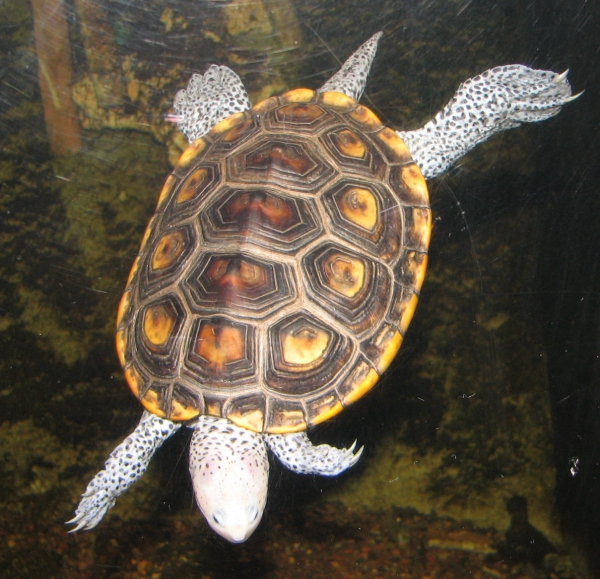
Floridan terrapins have "diamonds" with light centers

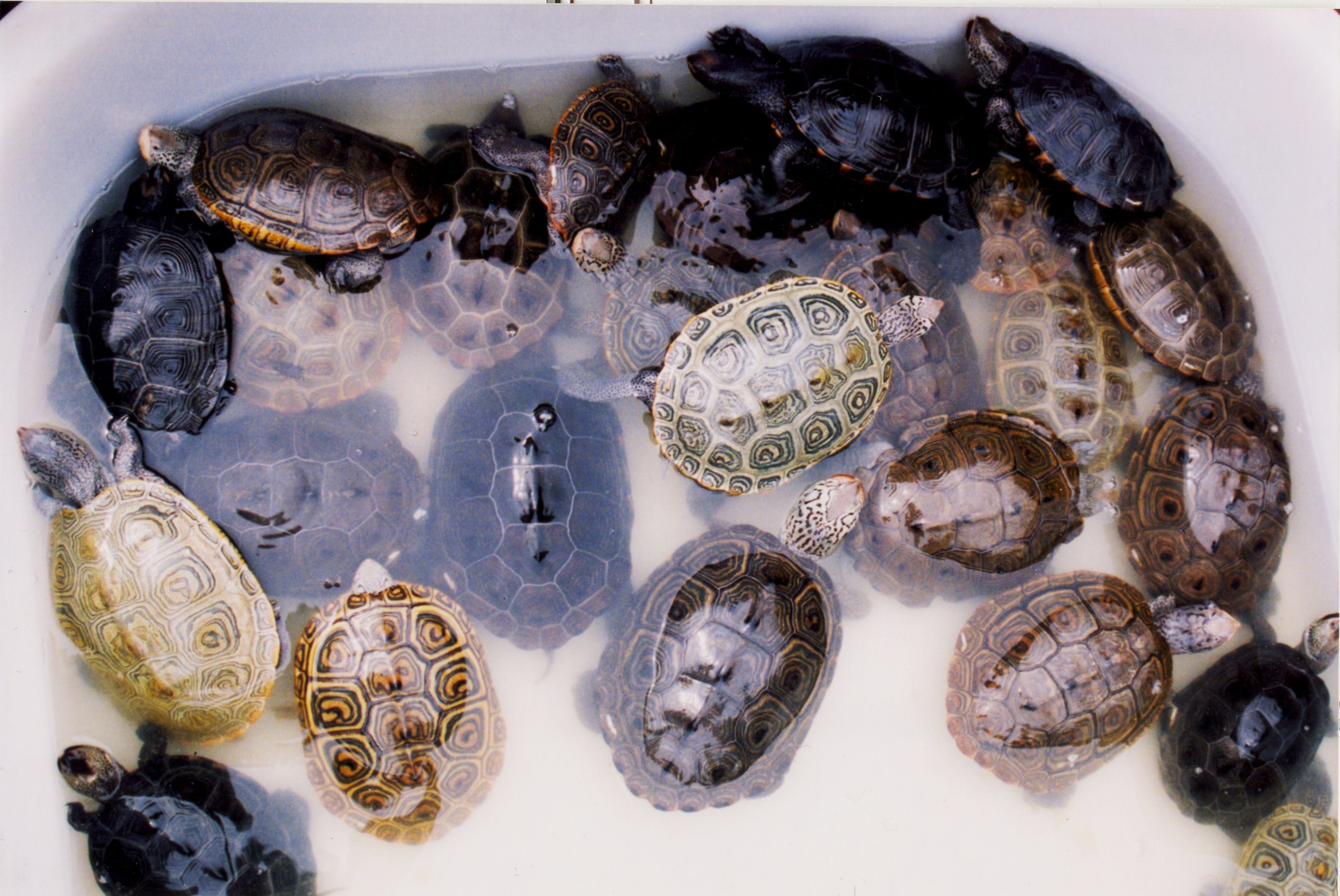
A tub full of diamondback terrapins of various colours

=== Adaptations to their environment ===
Terrapins look much like their freshwater relatives, but are well adapted to the near shore marine environment. They have several adaptations that allow them to survive in varying salinities. They can live in full strength salt water for extended periods, and their skin is largely impermeable to salt. Terrapins have lachrymal salt glands, not present in their relatives, which are used primarily when the turtle is dehydrated. They can distinguish between drinking water of different salinities. Terrapins also exhibit unusual and sophisticated behavior to obtain fresh water, including drinking the freshwater surface layer that can accumulate on top of salt water during rainfall and raising their heads into the air with mouths open to catch falling rain drops.

Terrapins are strong swimmers. They have strongly webbed hind feet, but not flippers like sea turtles do. Like their relatives (Graptemys), they have strong jaws for crushing shells of prey, such as clams and snails. This is especially true of females, who have larger and more muscular jaws than males.

=== Subspecies ===
Seven subspecies are recognized, including the nominate race, but not all of them may be truly distinct:

- M. t. terrapin (Schoepff, 1793) – northern diamondback terrapin (Connecticut, Delaware, Maryland, Massachusetts, New Jersey, New York, North Carolina, Rhode Island, Virginia; from Cape Cod to Cape Hatteras). Carapace blackish to olive-brown, with strong "diamond" pattern and a barely notable central ridge, plastron orange-yellow to grayish-green.
- M. t. centrata (Latreille, 1801) – Carolina diamondback terrapin (Georgia, Florida, North Carolina, South Carolina; Cape Hatteras to extreme northeastern Florida). Similar to M.t.terrapin, but with a low carapace ridge.
- M. t. pileata (Wied, 1865) – Mississippi diamondback terrapin (Alabama, Florida, Louisiana, Mississippi, Texas; from westernmost Florida to easternmost Texas). Similar to M.t.centrata, but with the tailward half of the carapace ridge forming prominent round bumps, and the upper head, neck and legs almost black.
- M. t. littoralis (Hay, 1904) – Texas diamondback terrapin (westernmost Louisiana to Texas). Similar to M. t. pileata, but plastron and top of the head paler.
- M. t. macrospilota (Hay, 1904) – ornate diamondback terrapin (west coast of Florida). Similar to M.t.centrata, but carapace ridge with prominent narrow tips for its entire length, and center of carapace shields yellow to orange.
- M. t. rhizophorarum Fowler, 1906 – mangrove diamondback terrapin (Florida Keys). Carapace more narrow and elongated than in other subspecies, brown to blackish and with rounded bumps along the entire ridge; head and forelegs with few to no black spots.
- M. t. tequesta Schwartz, 1955 – East Florida diamondback terrapin (east coast of Florida). Similar to M.t.macrospilota, but with a bumpy tailward carapace ridge like M.t.pileata

The isolated Bermudan population, which arrived in Bermuda on its own rather than being introduced by humans, has not yet been officially assigned to a subspecies but, based on mtDNA, it is closely related to the population from the Carolinas.

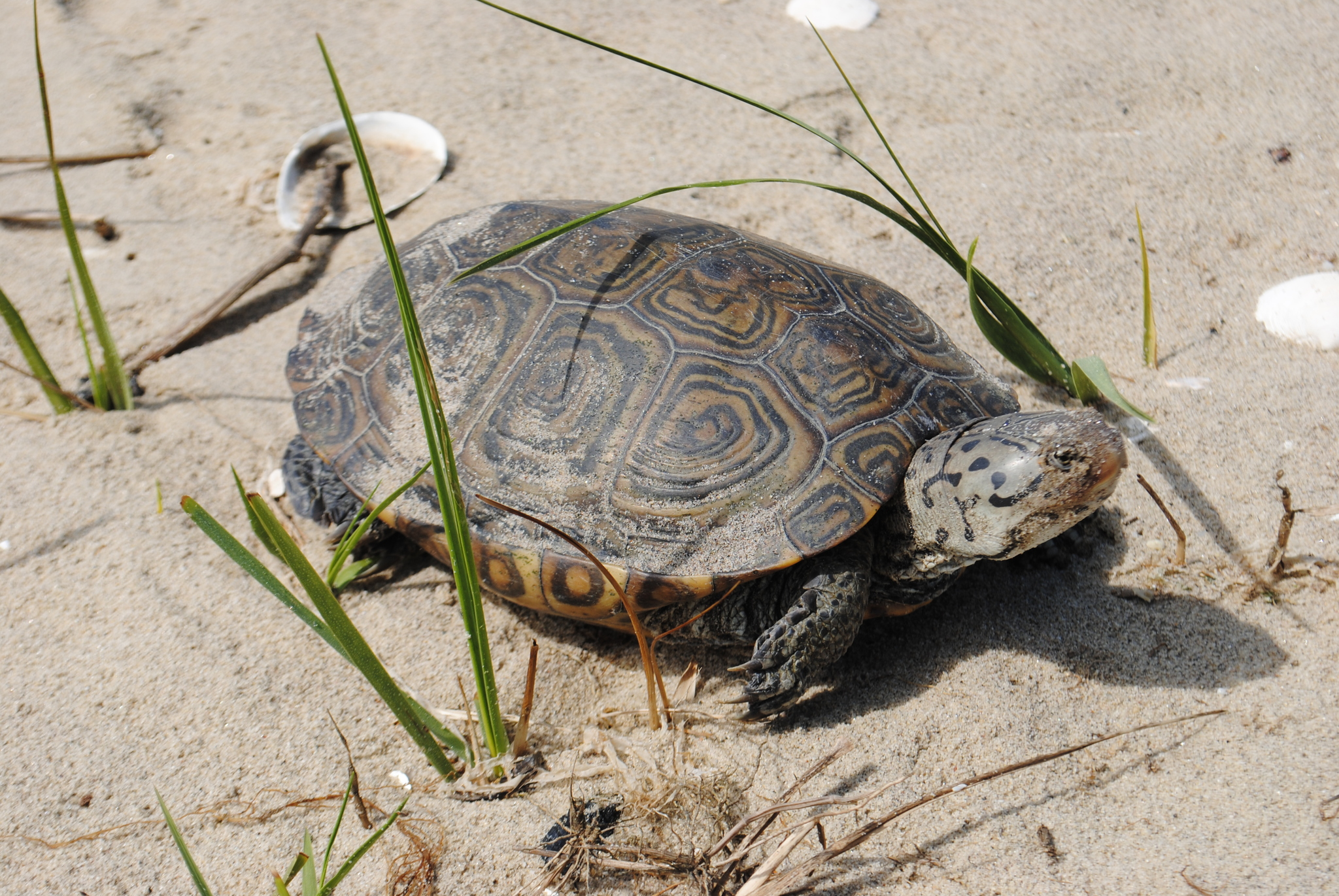
M.t.terrapin

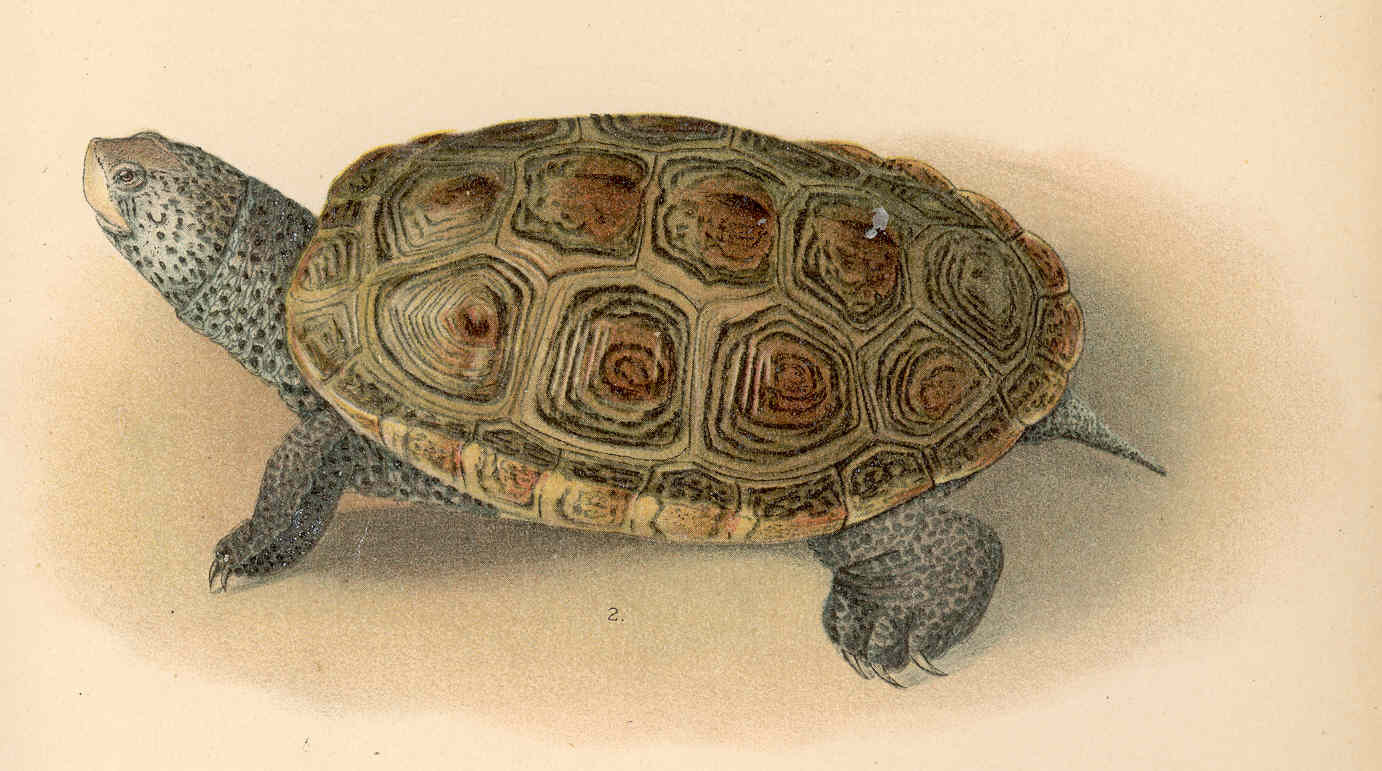
M.t.centrata

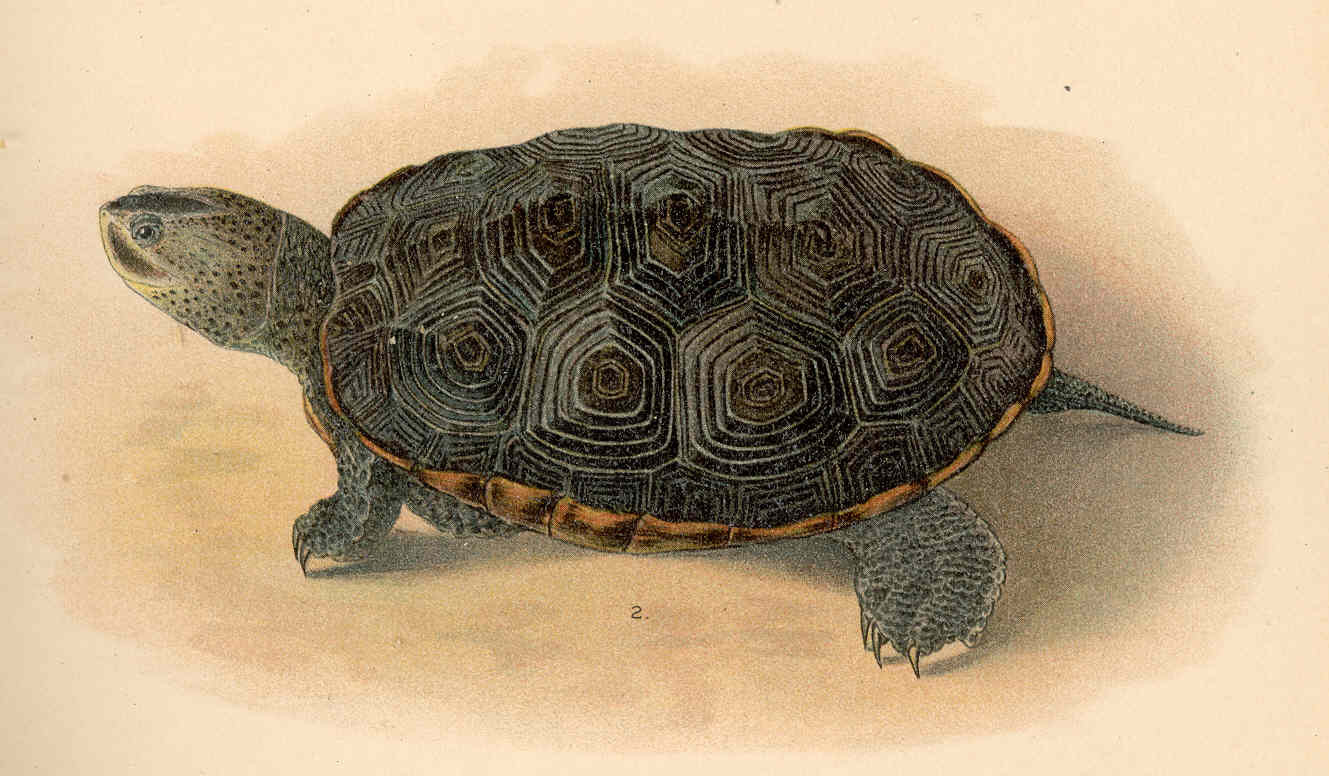
M.t.pileata

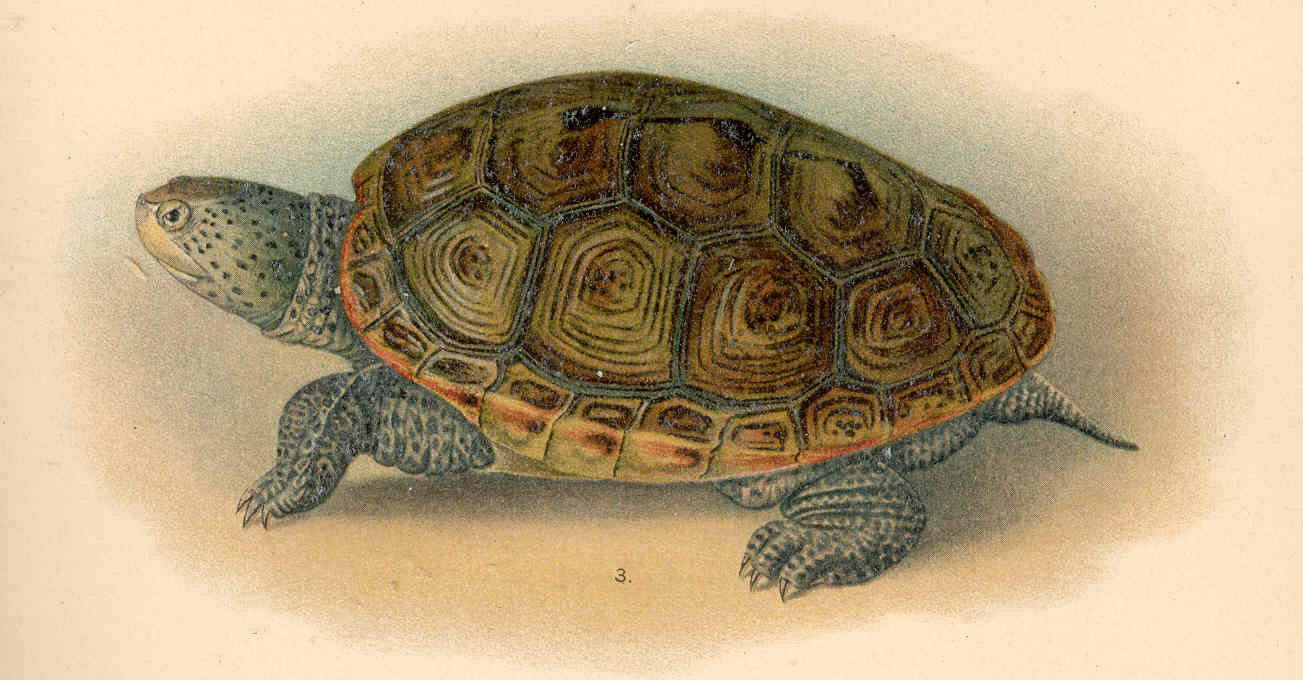
M.t.littoralis

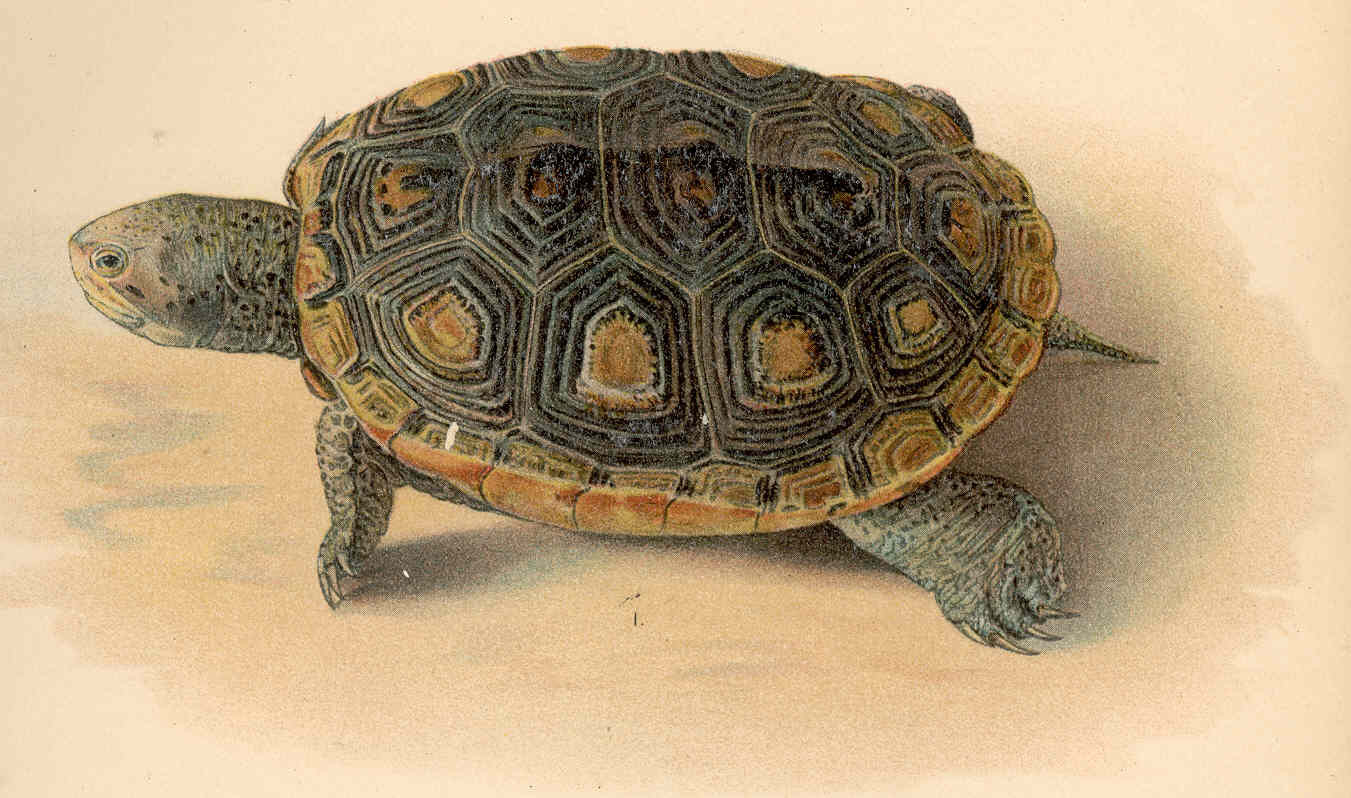
M.t.macrospilota

== Distribution and habitat ==
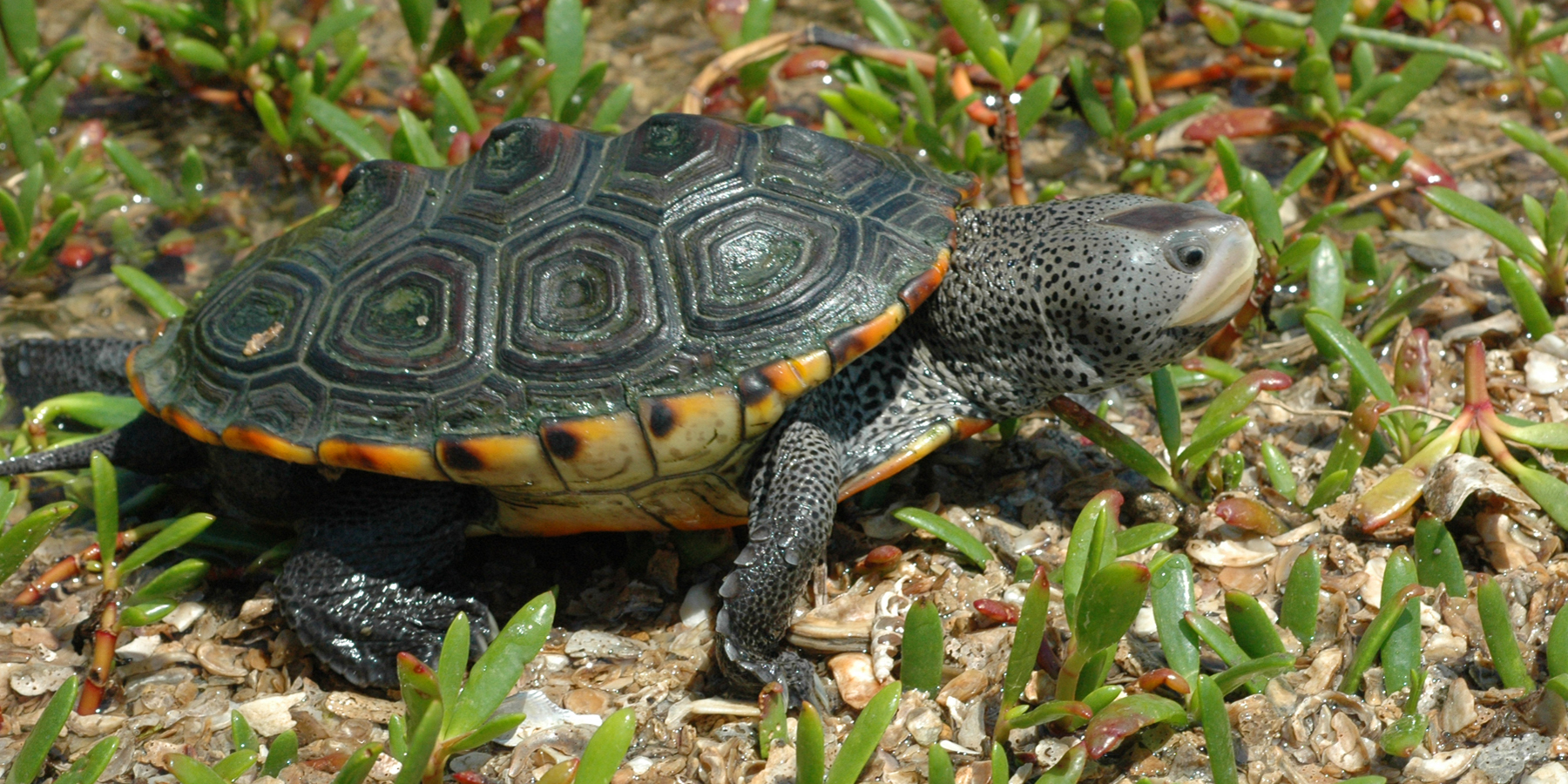
Texas diamond-backed terrapin (Malaclemys terrapin littoralis), Galveston County, Texas (8 May 2008)

Diamondback terrapins live in the very narrow strip of coastal habitats on the Atlantic and Gulf Coasts of the United States, from as far north as Cape Cod, Massachusetts, to the southern tip of Florida and around the Gulf Coast to Texas. In most of their range, terrapins live in Spartina marshes that are flooded at high tide, but in Florida they also live in mangrove swamps. This turtle can survive in freshwater as well as full-strength ocean water, but adults prefer intermediate salinities. Despite its preference for salt water, it is not a true sea turtle and is not fully marine. They have no competition from other turtles, although common snapping turtles do occasionally make use of salty marshes. It is unclear why terrapins do not inhabit the upper reaches of rivers within their range, as in captivity they tolerate fresh water. It is possible they are limited by the distribution of their prey. Terrapins live quite close to shore, unlike sea turtles, which wander far out to sea; however, a population of terrapins on Bermuda has been determined to be self-established rather than introduced by humans. Terrapins tend to live in the same areas for most or all of their lives, and do not make long-distance migrations.

== Life cycle ==
Adult diamondback terrapins mate in the early spring, and clutches of 4–22 eggs are laid in sand dunes in the early summer. They hatch in late summer or early fall. Maturity in males is reached in 2–3 years at around 115 mm (4 1/2 in) in length; it takes longer for females: 6–7 years (8–10 years for northern diamondback terrapins) at a length of around 170 mm (6 3/4 in).

=== Reproduction ===
Like all reptiles, terrapin fertilization occurs internally. Courtship has been seen in May and June, and is similar to that of the closely related red-eared slider (Trachemys scripta). Female terrapins can mate with multiple males and store sperm for years, resulting in some clutches of eggs with more than one father.

Like many turtles, terrapins have temperature dependent sex determination, meaning that the sex of hatchlings is the result of incubation temperature. Females can lay up to three clutches of eggs/year in the wild, and up to five clutches/year in captivity. It is not known how often they may skip reproduction, so true clutch frequency is unknown.

Females may wander considerable distances on land before nesting. Nests are usually laid in sand dunes or scrub vegetation near the ocean in June and July, but nesting may start as early as late April in Florida. Females will quickly abandon a nest attempt if they are disturbed while nesting. Clutch sizes vary latitudinally, with average clutch sizes as low as 5.8/eggs/clutch in southern Florida to 10.9 in New York. After covering the nest, terrapins quickly return to the ocean and do not return except to nest again.

The eggs usually hatch in 60–85 days, depending on the temperature and the depth of the nest. Hatchlings usually emerge from the nest in August and September, but may overwinter in the nest after hatching. Nest predation is a large threat to Diamondback Terrapins. A study was done on 3159 nests finding that the greatest predator was racoons and predated nests were completely emptied of egg. Hatchlings sometimes stay on land in the nesting areas in both fall and spring and they may remain terrestrial for much or all of the winter in some places. Hatchling terrapins are freeze tolerant, which may facilitate overwintering on land. Hatchlings have lower salt tolerance than adults and Gibbons et al. provided strong evidence that one- and two-year-old terrapins use different habitats than do old individuals.

Growth rates, age of maturity, and maximum age are not well known for terrapins in the wild, but males reach sexual maturity before females because of their smaller adult size. In females at least, sexual maturity is dependent on size rather than age. Estimations of age based on counts of growth rings on the shell are as yet untested, so it is not clear how to determine the ages of wild terrapins.

=== Seasonal activities ===
Because nesting is the only terrapin activity that occurs on land, most other aspects of terrapin behavior are poorly known. Limited data suggest that terrapins hibernate in the colder months in most of their range, in the mud of creeks and marshes.

== Diet ==
The diamondback terrapin typically feeds on fish, crustaceans (such as shrimp and crabs), marine worms, marine snails (especially the saltmarsh periwinkle), clams, barnacles, mussels, other mollusks, insects, carrion, and sometimes ingest small amounts of plant material, such as algae. At high densities the terrapin may eat enough invertebrates to have ecosystem-level effects, partially because periwinkles themselves can overgraze important marsh plants, such as cordgrass (Spartina alterniflora). Gender and age can greatly affect the diet of the diamondback terrapin; males and juvenile females tend to have less diversity in their diet. Adult females, due to their powerful, defined jaw, will occasionally feed on crustaceans such as crabs and are more likely to consume hard-shelled mollusks.

== Conservation ==
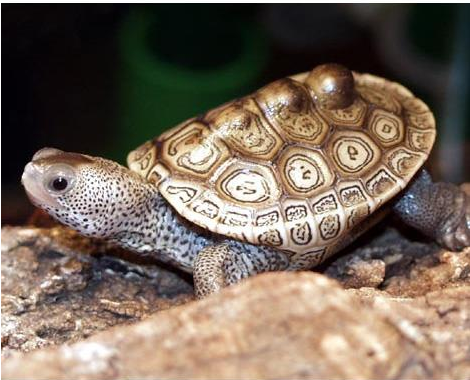
A juvenile diamondback terrapin

=== Status ===
In the early 1900s, the species was considered a delicacy and was hunted almost to extinction. The population also decreased due to the development of coastal areas, terrapins being susceptible to wounds from the propellers on motorboats.

Another common cause of death is the trapping of the turtles in recreational crab traps, as the turtles are attracted to the same bait as the crabs. The Wetlands Institute estimates that a minimum of 14,000 to 15,000 terrapins drown in crab traps annually set along the New Jersey coast alone. Countless more drown or starve to death in ghost traps, abandoned or lost crab traps along with discarded nets, throughout their habitat. Among two such abandoned crab pots in a tidal marsh in Georgia, a study found 133 dead terrapins, according to the Center for Biological Diversity.

Further, an increase in seawalls and bulkheads being built for storm and erosion control, exacerbated by climate change and sea level rise, inadvertently eliminate terrapin's nesting habitat on beaches and upland areas with soft shorelines.

Due to these factors, the diamondback terrapin is listed as an endangered species in Rhode Island, a threatened species in Massachusetts and is considered a "species of concern" in Georgia, Delaware, Alabama, Louisiana, North Carolina, and Virginia. The diamondback terrapin is listed as a "high priority species" under the South Carolina Wildlife Action Plan. In New Jersey, it was recommended to be listed as a Species of Special Concern in 2001. In July 2016, the species was removed from the New Jersey game list and is now listed as non-game with no hunting season. In Connecticut, there is no open hunting season for this animal. However, it holds no federal conservation status. In 2021, a terrapin was hatched in Massachusetts with two heads, two gastrointestinal systems, and two spines that are fused together.

=== Conservation status ===
The species is classified as Vulnerable by the IUCN due to decreasing population numbers in most of its range. There is limited protection for terrapins on a state-by-state level throughout its range; it is listed as Endangered in Rhode Island and Threatened in Massachusetts. The Diamondback Terrapin Working Group deal with regional protection issues. There is no national protection except through the Lacey Act, and little international protection.

Diamondback terrapins are the only U.S. turtles that inhabit the brackish waters of estuaries, tidal creeks and salt marshes. With a historic range stretching from Massachusetts to Texas, terrapin populations have been severely depleted by land development and other human impacts along the Atlantic coast.

Earthwatch Institute, a global non-profit that teams volunteers with scientists to conduct important environmental research, supports a research program called "Tagging the Terrapins of the Jersey Shore". This program allows volunteers to explore the coastal sprawl of New Jersey's Ocean County on Barnegat Bay, one of the most extensive salt marsh ecosystems on the East Coast, in search of this ornate turtle. On this project, volunteers contribute to environmental sustainability in the face of rampant development. Veteran turtle scientists Dr. Hal Avery, Dr. Jim Spotila, Dr. Walter Bien and Dr. Ed Standora are overseeing this program and the viability of terrapin populations in the face of growing environmental change.

=== Threats ===
The conservation status was heavily impacted by the consumption of diamondback terrapins in the 1900s when their sweet meat eventually became a multi-million dollar industry for gourmet restaurants. Around the 1920s, with the enforcement of prohibition, the consumption of diamondback terrapins declined. Since then, however, the population has never fully recovered. Another threat is exposure to paralytic shellfish toxins (PST), such as saxitoxins, which may contaminate mussels and other shellfish in terrapins' diets and are a result of the harmful algal blooms that have been prominent along the coastline where diamondback terrapins reside. Gastrointestinal studies have identified the presence of ingested PST in their tissues which causes the muscle weakness, paralysis, etc. that eventually lead to death.

The major threats to diamondback terrapins are all associated with humans and probably differ in different parts of their range. People tend to build their cities on ocean coasts near the mouths of large rivers and in doing so they have destroyed many of the huge marshes that terrapins inhabited. Nationwide, probably >75% of the salt marshes where terrapins lived have been destroyed or altered. Currently, ocean level rise threatens the remainder.

Traps used to catch crabs, both commercially and privately, have commonly caught and drowned many diamondback terrapins, which can result in male-biased populations, local population declines, and even extinctions. When these traps are lost or abandoned ("ghost traps"), they can kill terrapins for many years. Terrapin-excluding devices are available to retrofit crab traps; these reduce the number of terrapins captured while having little or no impact on crab capture rates. In some states (NJ, DE, MD), these devices are required by law.

Nests, hatchlings, and sometimes adults are commonly eaten by raccoons, foxes, rats and many species of birds, especially crows and gulls. Density of these predators are often increased because of their association with humans. Predation rates can be extremely high; predation by raccoons on terrapin nests at Jamaica Bay Wildlife Refuge in New York varied from 92 to 100% each year from 1998 to 2008, Burke unpubl. data).

Terrapins are killed by cars when nesting females cross roads and mortality can be high enough to seriously affect populations, especially during active periods, such as the breeding season. Terrapins are still harvested for food in some states. Terrapins may be affected by pollutants such as metals and organic compounds, but this has not been demonstrated in wild populations.

There is an active casual and professional pet trade in terrapins and it is unknown how many are removed from the wild for this purpose. Some people breed the species in captivity and some color variants are considered especially desirable. In Europe, Malaclemys are widely kept as pets, as are many closely related species.

== Relationship with humans ==
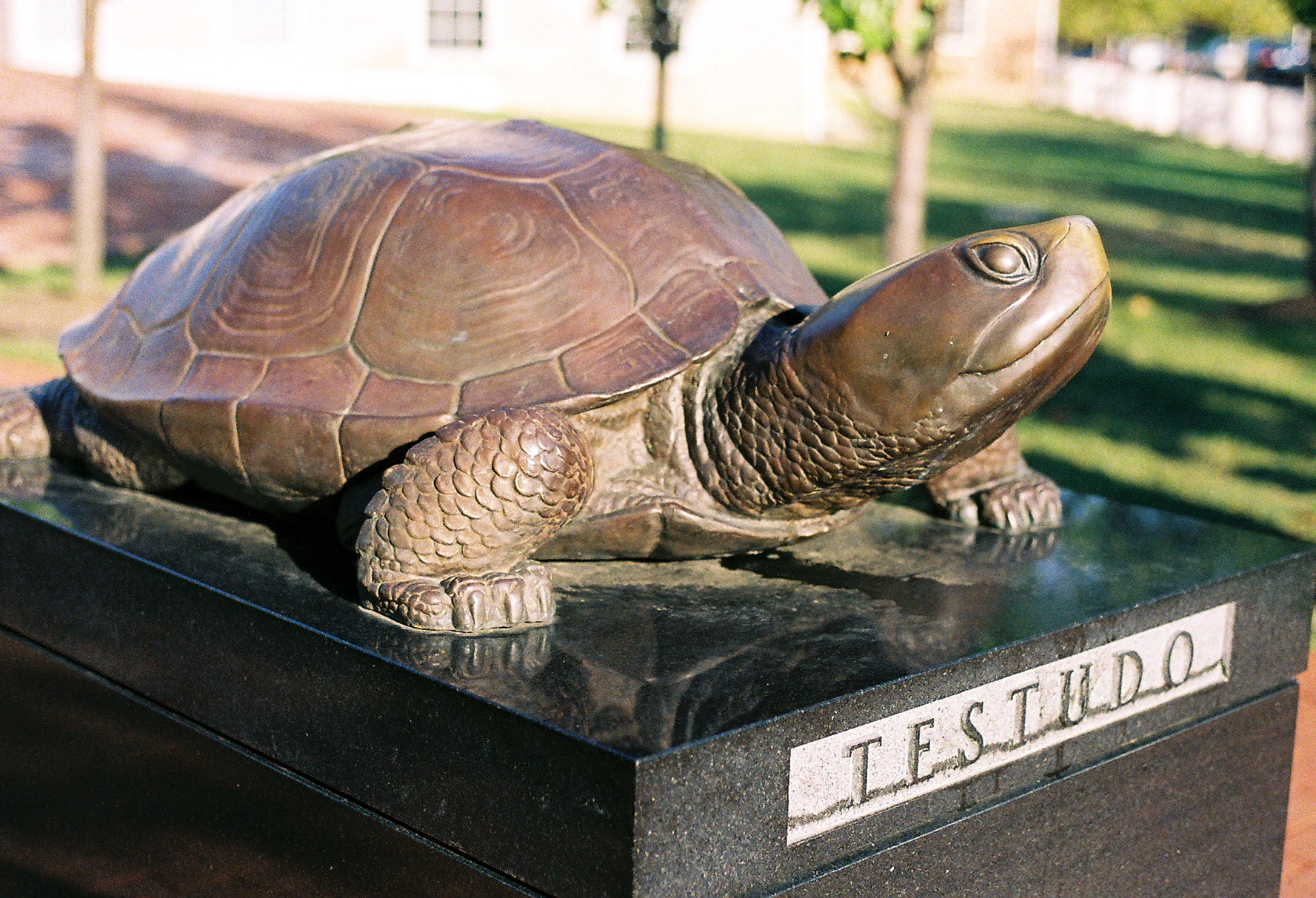
University of Maryland's Testudo statue

In Maryland, diamondback terrapins were so plentiful in the 18th century that slaves protested the excessive use of this food source as their main protein. Late in the 19th century, demand for turtle soup claimed a harvest of 89,150 pounds from Chesapeake Bay in one year. In 1899, terrapin was offered on the dinner menu of renowned Delmonico's Restaurant in New York City as its third most expensive item. Either Maryland or Baltimore terrapin was available for $2.50 (equivalent to $75.46 in 2018). Although demand was high, over-harvesting diminished capture to a mere 823 pounds by 1920.

According to the FAA National Wildlife Strike Database, a total of 18 strikes between diamondback terrapins and civil aircraft were reported in the US from 1990 to 2007, none of which caused damage to the aircraft. On July 8, 2009, flights at John F. Kennedy Airport in New York City were delayed for up to one and a half hours as 78 diamondback terrapins had invaded one of the runways. The turtles, which according to airport authorities were believed to have entered the runway in order to nest, were removed and released back into the wild. A similar incident happened on June 29, 2011, when over 150 turtles crossed runway 4, closing the runway and disrupting air traffic. Those terrapins were also relocated safely. The Port Authority of New York and New Jersey installed a turtle barrier along runway 4L at JFK to reduce the number of terrapins on the runway and encourage them to nest elsewhere. Nevertheless, on June 26, 2014, 86 terrapins made it onto the same runway, as a high tide carried them over the barrier. Their population is controlled by the raccoon population; it has been shown that as the raccoons decrease in number, mating terrapins increase, leading to increased turtle activity at the airport.

Many human activities threaten the safety of diamondback terrapins. The terrapins get caught and drown in crab nets that humans put out, are suffocated by pollution that humans greatly contribute to, and lose their marsh and estuarine habitats because of urban development. Recent anthropogenic habitat modification, such as the construction of docks, roads, and housing developments, as well as activities such as crab-trapping, likely play a role in low annual survivorship.

=== History as a delicacy ===
Part of the pleasure of eating terrapin when the fashion was at its height, however, was its outré, bizarre, even monstrous essential nature...Killing, cleaning, and preparing terrapin is not easy...

— Paul Freedman

Diamondback terrapins were heavily harvested for food in colonial America and probably before that by Native Americans. Terrapins were so abundant and easily obtained that slaves and even the Continental Army ate large numbers of them.

In the 19th century, a dish called "Terrapin à la Maryland", a stew with cream and sherry, was a canonical element, along with canvasback duck, of the elegant and regional "Maryland Feast" menu, an "elite standard...that lasted for decades".

By 1917, terrapins sold for as much as $5 each (equivalent to $95.66 in 2017). Huge numbers of terrapins were harvested from marshes and marketed in cities. By the early 1900s, populations in the northern part of the range were severely depleted and the southern part was greatly reduced as well. As early as 1902 the U.S. Bureau of Fisheries (which later became the U.S. Fish and Wildlife Service) recognized that terrapin populations were declining and started building large research facilities, centered at the Beaufort, North Carolina Fisheries Laboratory, to investigate methods for captive breeding terrapins for food. People tried (unsuccessfully) to establish them in many other locations, including San Francisco.

=== Use as a symbol ===
Maryland named the diamondback terrapin its official state reptile in 1994. The University of Maryland, College Park has used the species as its nickname (the Maryland Terrapins) and mascot (Testudo) since 1933, and the school newspaper has been named The Diamondback since 1921. Accordingly, the athletic teams are often known as "Terps" for short. The Baltimore baseball club entry in the Federal League during 1914 and 1915 was called the Baltimore Terrapins. The terrapin has also been a symbol of the Grateful Dead, upon the release of their studio album, Terrapin Station; as a result, many images of the terrapin dancing with a tambourine appear on posters and t-shirts in Grateful Dead memorabilia. Inspired by the song, the Terrapin Beer Company also uses a terrapin as its namesake and logo on its packaging.

== Bibliography ==
- Conant, Roger (1975). A Field Guide to Reptiles and Amphibians of Eastern and Central North America (2nd ed.). Boston: Houghton Mifflin.
- Smith, Hobart Muir; Brody, E.D. (1982). Reptiles of North America: A Guide to Field Identification. New York: Golden Press.
