= Dolly rope =

In fishing, dolly rope (abrasion protection ropes) is a bundle of durable polyethylene plastic threads (density: 0.87–0.97; North Sea water: 1.025–1027; Baltic Sea water: 1.005–1020 in ton/m³) that is attached to the underside of bottom trawls (especially in crab and flatfish fisheries). The ropes serve as abrasion protection to prevent the actual net from rubbing against the hard seabed.

In the Netherlands and Belgium, dolly ropes are commonly known in the fishing industry as vispluis (or simply pluis; Fischflusen, -fluff), and in Belgian-Dutch/Flemish fisheries they are also referred to as spekking.

In principle, high-density PE (HDPE) would also tend to float, provided it does not become entangled in rocks or seaweed—and subsequently break down into microplastics.

== Background and environmental impact ==
- Wear and tear: During fishing, the fishing lines rub against the seabed, fray, and break off in large quantities, intentionally or unintentionally. In the North Sea alone, tens of thousands of kilograms of plastic waste end up in the environment every year.
- Danger to birds: Seabirds like gannets collect the colorful plastic threads for nest building. Young birds often become entangled in them and strangle themselves fatally.
- Possible violation of the MARPOL Convention.

== Current developments and alternatives ==
- Political stance: The German Federal Government has so far rejected an immediate national ban and is instead relying on a joint regulation within the framework of the OSPAR environmental strategy. A phased phase-out was decided in June 2026.
- Voluntary renunciation: German crab fishermen have already voluntarily committed themselves to no longer using dolly ropes since 2023.
- "Dolly ropes are used by fishermen from many different North Sea coastal states. According to a study by the OSPAR Commission, this amounts to about 100,000 tonnes per year. Of this, an estimated 35,000 to 50,000 tonnes end up in the North Sea, where wind and currents carry them to the coasts. The study identifies fishermen from the Netherlands and Belgium as the main culprits. The consequences are particularly evident on Heligoland."
- Technical solutions: Research is being conducted on alternatives (e.g., modified net cutting through the DROPS project of the Thünen Institute) or on practical inventions such as the “ Steert buoy” (engl. codend...) by the Föhr crab fisherman Henning Dulz, which holds the net above the ground without chafing protection.
- Projects such as VisPluisVrij or trials involving biodegradable "Biopluis" made from biopolymers (e.g., from Senbis) are exploring more environmentally friendly solutions, even though these are currently still significantly more expensive.

== See also ==
- Ghost net
