= Coastal Conservation Association =

U.S. non-profit organization

Logo of the Coastal Conservation Association

The Coastal Conservation Association is a grassroots, non-profit, social movement organization of salt water anglers from 17 coastal states spanning the Gulf of Mexico, Atlantic, and Pacific coasts. The CCA is primarily concerned with the restoration and conservation of coastal marine resources. It operates on all three governmental tiers, those being the national, state, and local levels.

== History ==
Coastal Conservation Association (CCA) is a non-profit organization with 17 coastal state chapters spanning the Gulf of Mexico, the Atlantic seaboard, and the Pacific Northwest.

CCA began in 1977 after drastic commercial overfishing along the Texas coast decimated redfish and speckled trout populations. 14 concerned recreational anglers created the Gulf Coast Conservation Association to combat commercial overfishing.

The stewardship started with the "Save the Redfish" campaign, and by 1985, chapters had formed along the Gulf Coast. By the early ‘90s, the mid-Atlantic region and the New England had chapters. Washington and Oregon opened CCA chapters in 2007.

CCA has participated in virtually every national fisheries debate since 1984. In the federal court system, CCA’s legal defense fund has been used to defend net bans; fight for the implementation of bycatch reduction devices; support pro-fisheries legislation; and battle arbitrary no-fishing zones.

The CCA network is engaged in hundreds of local, state, and national projects that initiate scientific studies; fund marine-science scholarships; build artificial reefs; create Finfish hatcheries; initiate hydrologic and contaminant studies; monitor freshwater inflows; support local marine law enforcement; and more.

=== Organization ===
The CCA functions as a bottom up enterprise, focusing on the grassroots level of local politics and traveling up all the way through national levels of government.

The CCA has 100,000 members in 206 chapters throughout the 17 local states. It has more than 80 state and national committees, 150 national board directors and over 900 board members. CCA currently retains approximately 17 state and national lobbyists.

=== CCA Fisheries Committees ===
1. Atlantic States Fisheries Committee
2. South Atlantic Fisheries Committee
3. Gulf of Mexico Fisheries Committee
4. Pacific Northwest Fisheries Committee

=== Mission statement ===
"The stated purpose of the CCA is to advise and educate the public on conservation of marine resources. The objective of the CCA is to conserve, promote, and enhance the present and future availability of these coastal resources for the benefit and enjoyment of the general public."

== See also ==
- National Wetlands Research Center
- The Derelict Crab Trap Program
