= Ghost net =

Fishing net left or lost in the sea, endangering marine animals or human divers

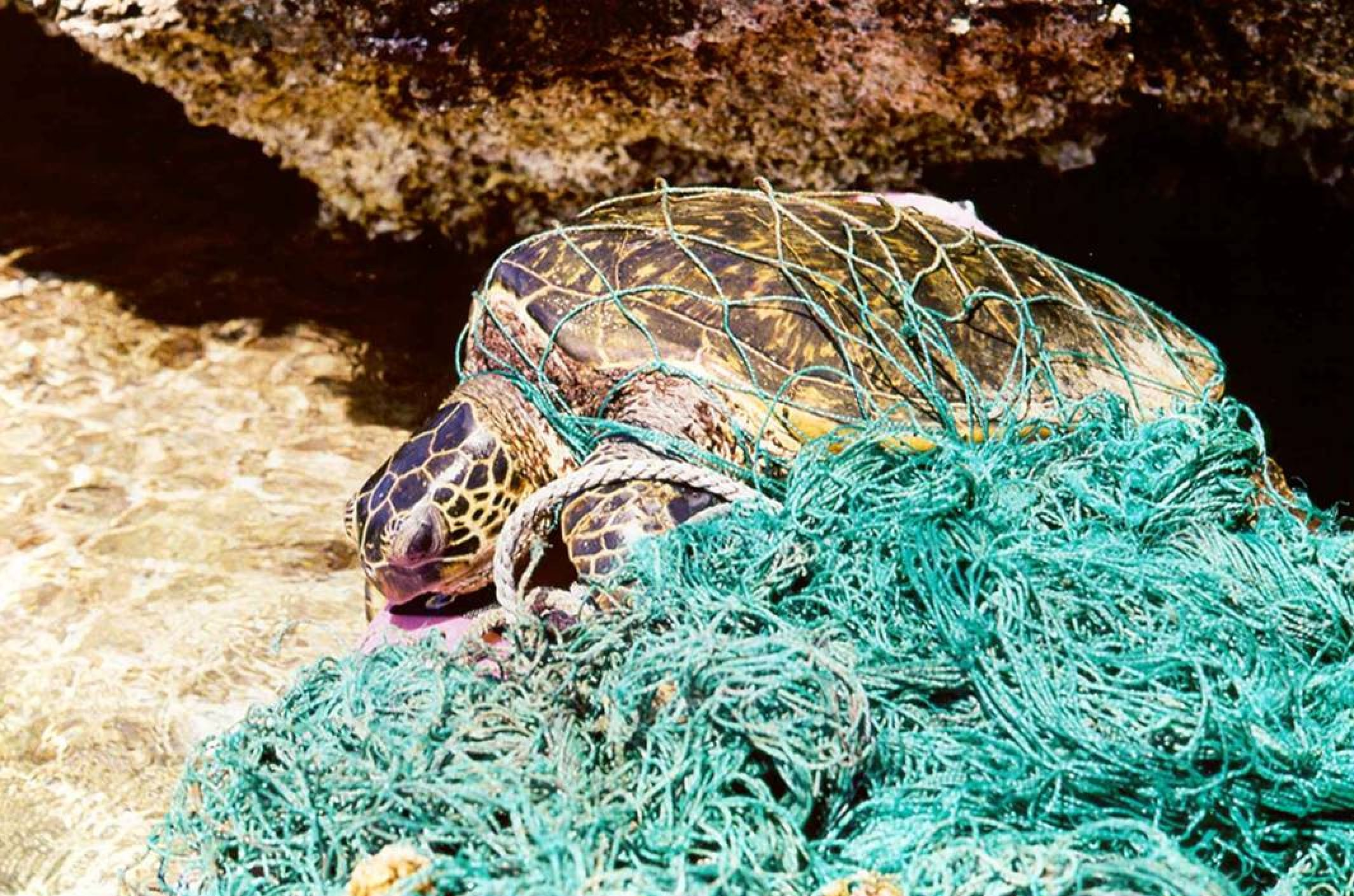
A sea turtle entangled in a ghost net.

Ghost nets are fishing nets that have been abandoned, lost, or otherwise discarded in the ocean, lakes, and rivers. These nets, often nearly invisible in the dim light, can be left tangled on a rocky reef or drifting in the open sea. They can entangle fish, dolphins, sea turtles, sharks, dugongs, crocodiles, seabirds, crabs, and other creatures, including the occasional human diver. Acting as designed, the nets restrict movement, causing starvation, laceration and infection, and suffocation in those that need to return to the surface to breathe. It is estimated that around 48-100 thousand tons of lost fishing gear is generated each year, not including those that were abandoned or discarded and these may linger in the oceans for a considerable time before breaking up.

== Description ==
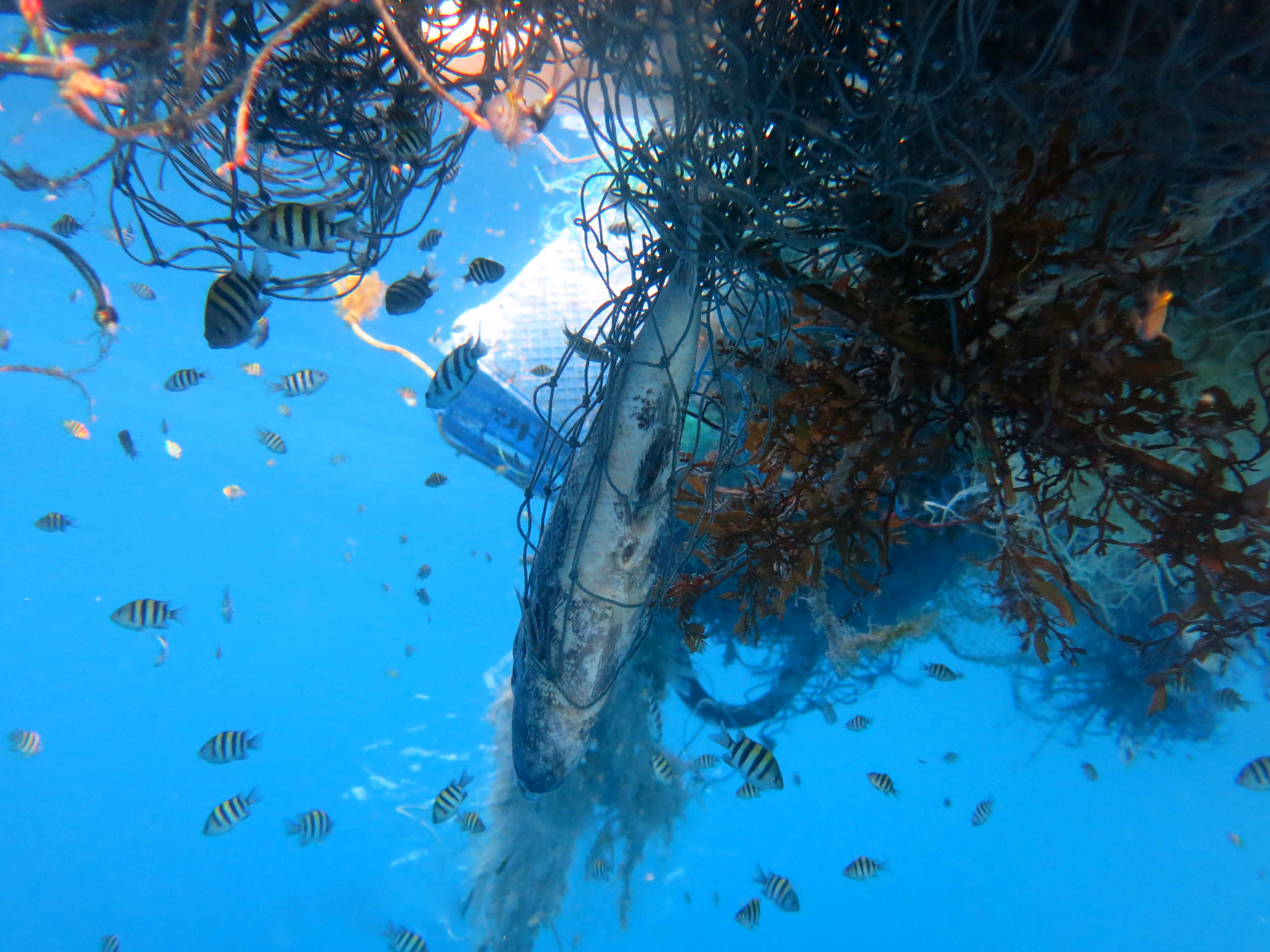
Many marine species including turtles, sharks, whales, dolphins, and dugongs become entangled in ghost nets. Most go unnoticed and unrecorded.

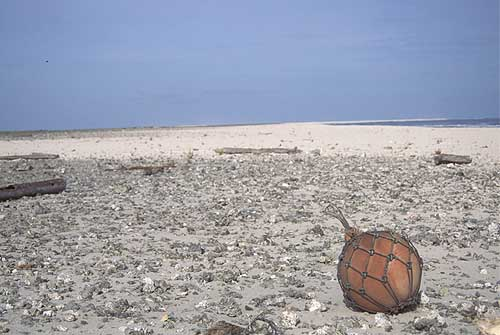
A glass float on the beach. Many of these floats for fish nets wash up on island beaches around the Pacific. The loss of the floats can leave fish nets drifting in the open ocean where they continue to entangle fish, birds, and marine mammals.

Some commercial fishermen use gillnets. These are suspended in the sea by flotation buoys, such as glass floats, along one edge. In this way they can form a vertical wall hundreds of metres long, where any fish within a certain size range can be caught. Normally these nets are collected by fishermen and the catch removed.

If this is not done, the net can continue to catch fish until the weight of the catch exceeds the buoyancy of the floats. The net then sinks, and the fish are devoured by bottom-dwelling crustaceans and other fish. Then the floats pull the net up again and the cycle continues. Given the high-quality synthetics that are used today, the destruction can continue for a long time.

The problem is not just nets but ghost gear in general; old-fashioned crab traps, without the required "rot-out panel", also sit on the bottom, where they become self-baiting traps that can continue to trap marine life for years. Even balled-up fishing line can be deadly for a variety of creatures, including birds and marine mammals. Over time the nets become more and more tangled. In general, fish are less likely to be trapped in gear that has been down a long time.

Fishermen sometimes abandon worn-out nets because it is often the easiest way to get rid of them.

The French government offered a reward for ghost nets handed in to local coastguards along sections of the Normandy coast between 1980 and 1981. The project was abandoned when people vandalized nets to claim rewards, without retrieving anything at all from the shoreline or ocean.

In September 2015, the Global Ghost Gear Initiative (GGGI) was created by the World Animal Protection to give a unique and stronger voice to the cause.

The term ALDFG means "abandoned, lost and discarded fishing gear".

== Environmental impact ==
From 2000 to 2012, the National Marine Fisheries Service reported an average of 11 large whales entangled in ghost nets every year along the US west coast. From 2002 to 2010, 870 nets were recovered in Washington (state) with over 32,000 marine animals trapped inside. Ghost gear is estimated to account for 10% (640,000 tonnes) of all marine litter.

An estimated 46% of the Great Pacific Garbage Patch consists of fishing related plastics. Fishing nets account for about 1% of the total mass of all marine macroplastics larger than 200 millimetres (7.9 in), and plastic fishing gear overall constitutes over two-thirds of the total mass.

According to the SeaDoc Society, each ghost net kills $20,000 worth of Dungeness crab over 10 years. The Virginia Institute of Marine Science calculated that ghost crab pots capture 1.25 million blue crabs each year in the Chesapeake Bay alone.

In May 2016, the Australian Fisheries Management Authority (AFMA) recovered 10 tonnes of abandoned nets within the Australian Exclusive Economic Zone and Torres Strait protected zone perimeters. One protected turtle was rescued.

The northern Australian olive ridley sea turtle Lepidochelys olivacea, is a genetically distinct variation of the olive ridley sea turtle. Ghost nets pose a threat to the continued existence of the northern Australian variety. Without further action to preserve the northern Australian olive ridley sea turtle, the population could face extinction.

Researchers in Brazil used social media to estimate how ghost nets have negatively affected the Brazilian marine biota. Footage of ghost nets found on Google and YouTube were obtained and analyzed to arrive at the results of the study. They found that ghost nets have an adverse effect on several marine species, including large marine animals, such as the Bryde's whale and Guiana dolphin.

== Solutions ==
=== Alternative materials and practice ===
Unlike synthetic fishing nets, biodegradable fishing nets decompose naturally under water after a certain period of time. Coconut fibre (coir) fishing nets are commercially made and are hence a practical solution that can be taken by fishermen.

=== Collection and recycling ===
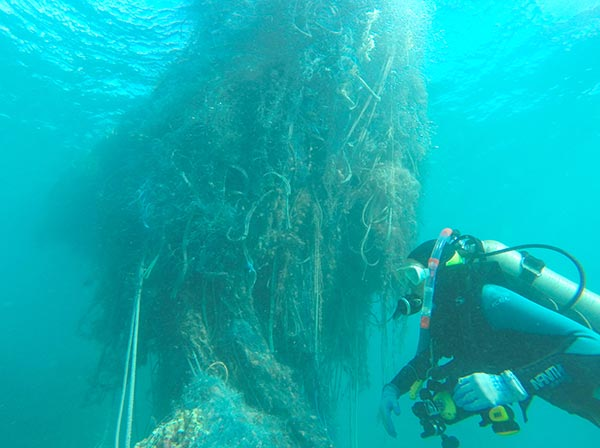
This net found at Pearl and Hermes Atoll in 2014 weighed 11.5 tons

Legalizing gear retrievals and establishing waste management systems is required to manage and mitigate abandoned, lost, and discarded fishing gear at-sea. The company Net-works worked out a solution to turn discarded fishing nets into carpet tiles.

Between 2008 and 2015, the US Fishing for Energy initiative collected 2.8 million pounds of fishing gear, and in partnership with Reworld turned this into enough electricity to power 182 homes for one year by incineration.

One retrieval initiative in Southwest Nova Scotia in Canada conducted 60 retrieval trips, searched ~1523 square kilometers of the seafloor and removed 7064 kg of abandoned, lost, and discarded fishing gear (ALDFG) (comprising 66% lobster traps and 22% dragger cable). Lost traps continued to capture target and non-target species. A total of 15 different species were released from retrieved ALDFG, including 239 lobsters (67% were market-sized) and seven groundfish (including five species-at-risk). The commercial losses from ALDFG in Southwest Nova Scotia were estimated at $175,000 CAD annually.

In 2009 world-renowned Dutch technical diver Pascal van Erp started to recover abandoned ghost fishing gear entangled on North Sea wrecks. He soon inspired others. Organised teams of volunteer technical divers recovered tons of ghost fishing gear off the Netherlands coastline. The loop was then closed - after a season's diving 22 tons of fishing gear was sent to the Aquafil Group for recycling back into new Nylon 6 material. In 2012 Pascal van Erp formally founded the not-for-profit Ghost Fishing organisation. In 2020 the Ghost Fishing Foundation rebranded as the Ghost Diving Foundation.

A plan to protect UK seas from ghost fishing was backed by the European Parliament Fisheries Committee in 2018. Mr. Flack, who led the committee, said: "Abandoned fishing nets are polluting our seas, wasting fishing stocks and indiscriminately killing whales, sea lions or even dolphins. The tragedy of ghost fishing must end".

Net amnesty schemes such as Fishing for Litter create incentives for the collection and responsible disposal of end of life fishing gear. These schemes address the root cause for many net abandonments, which is the financial cost of their disposal.

Fishing nets are often made from extremely high quality plastics to ensure suitable strength, which makes them desirable for recycling. Initiatives like Healthy Seas are connecting environmental cleanup projects to manufacturers to re-use these materials. Recycled waste nets can be made into yarn and consumer products, such as swimwear. A 2022 review of fishing-net recycling identified the Kelp Chair, a 3D-printed chair made from recycled fishing nets and wood fibre, as another application of recycled fishing-net material.

In Australia, the Carpentaria Ghost Nets Program has collaborated with indigenous communities to increase awareness of ghost nets and to foster long term solutions. The program has trained indigenous northern Australians in scouting for ghost nets and in removing ghost nets and other plastic pollution.

=== Proposed solutions ===
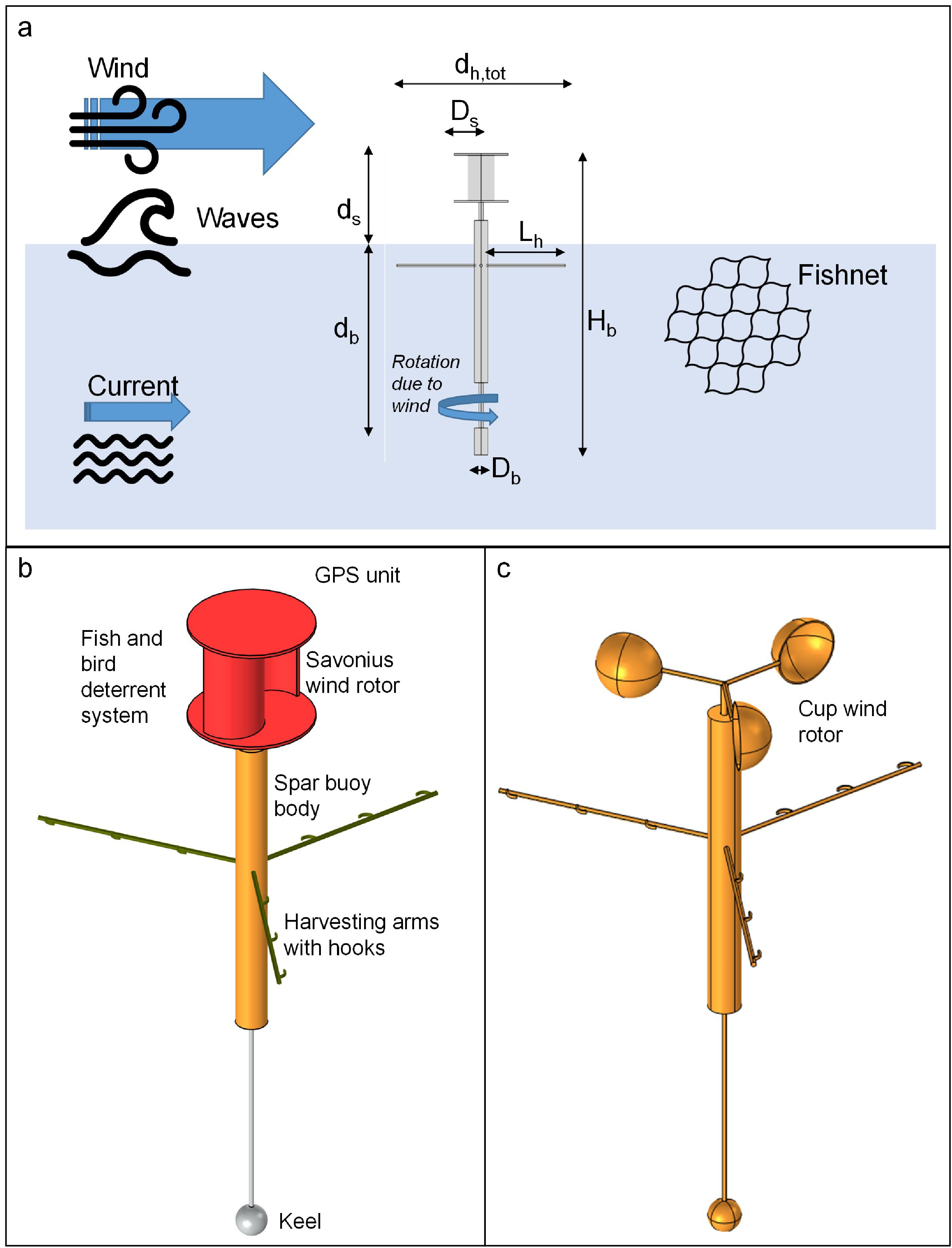
Concept of a net-harvesting buoy (b) based on a Savonius rotor (c) based on a cup rotor

Technology systems for marking and tracking fishing gear, including GPS tracking, are being trialled to promote greater accountability and transparency.

Finding ghost nets drifting at the ocean surface is a needle-in-a-haystack problem and is resource-intensive. In 2024, a net-harvesting buoy was proposed as a solution for neutralizing such fish nets (see diagram). This passive system finds ghost nets due to the difference in speed between the buoy and the drifting fish nets. The buoy catches them with its arms by entanglement, wrapping the fish nets around it.

Rotation is wind-driven using a Savonius wind turbine or cup-type vertical-axis rotor installed on the buoy. Once the net is caught, the buoy is tagged for collection. Many buoys are needed for such a decentralized solution to collect fishnets. However, ocean cleaning can be done at different locations simultaneously instead of at one centralized location. The concept is currently under evaluation.

== See also ==
- Drift netting
- Monofilament fishing line environmental impact
- The Derelict Crab Trap Program
- Dolly rope
- Plastic pollution
- Marine debris
- List of environmental issues

== Notes ==
1
