= Testudo (mascot) =

Mascot of the University of Maryland, College Park

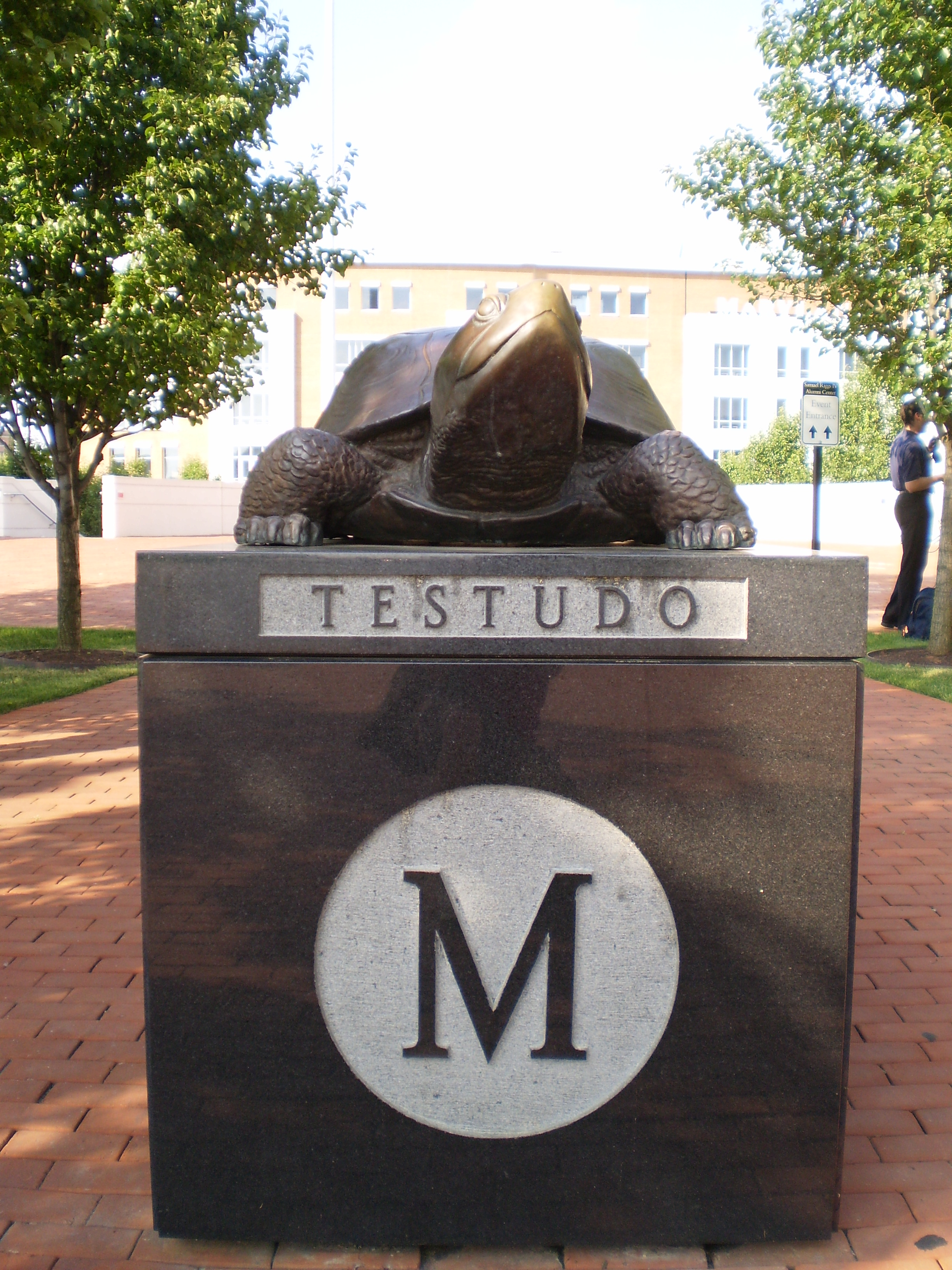
Statue of Testudo on campus

Testudo, a diamondback terrapin, is the mascot of the University of Maryland, College Park and represents the university both at sporting events and as a more general symbol. Testudo has served as the school's mascot since the 1930s, and several statues of the terrapin exist on the school's campus.

== History ==
=== Statues ===
In 1932, Curley Byrd—who served as the university's football and baseball coach, athletic director, and president—proposed adopting the diamondback terrapin as a mascot. The first statue of Testudo cast in bronze was donated by the Class of 1933 and displayed on Baltimore Avenue in front of Ritchie Coliseum. However, the 300-pound sculpture was subjected to vandalism by visiting college athletic teams. One such incident occurred in 1947 when students from Johns Hopkins University stole the bronze statue and moved it to their campus. Maryland students traveled to Baltimore to retrieve it, laying siege to the house where it was hidden. Over 200 city police responded to quell the riot. In 1949, University President Byrd was awakened by a phone call from a University of Virginia fraternity requesting Testudo be removed from their lawn. Testudo was later filled with 700 pounds of cement and fastened to his pedestal to prevent future removals, but students at rival schools continued to vandalize it. It was moved to Maryland Stadium in 1951. In the 1960s, Testudo was moved back to a central spot in front of McKeldin Library.

In 1992 a duplicate statue was placed at Maryland Stadium, where the football team touches it for good luck as they pass by before games. Additional Testudo statues now sit outside of the Gossett Team House near the stadium; XFINITY Center, the school's basketball arena; the Riggs Alumni Center; in the lobby of the Adele H. Stamp Student Union; and on the courtyard of Van Munching Hall. In 1994, the Maryland General Assembly approved legislation to name the diamondback terrapin (malaclemys terrapin terrapin) as the official state reptile and the legally codified mascot of the University of Maryland. Beginning in the 2000s, the university promoted the slogan "Fear the Turtle" as a rallying cry for school pride.

The nose of the statue outside McKeldin Library is polished by passers-by that have rubbed it for good luck. Around finals week, students start giving offerings to Testudo in the hope of good grades. Offerings began as small items such as alcohol, books, clothing, coins, food, and even letters to Testudo himself. However, in recent years, offerings have become much larger, with students offering furniture items and even stolen campus property such as traffic cones, road signs, trash cans, electric scooters, and streetlamps ripped from the ground. In 2013, the Testudo statue caught fire because of an ill-advised mixture of flammable offerings and a lit candle. Local news channels reported about this event and it trended on Twitter. During the COVID-19 pandemic, campus guidelines included instructions to not rub the statue's nose unless using disinfectant wipes before and after to clean it.

=== Costumed mascot ===
A costumed version of Testudo represents the school at some sporting events both at home and away, including football and men's basketball. Students are put through a try-out process to "become" the mascot, the costume for which features an "M"-stamped turtle shell.
