= Johann David Schoepff =

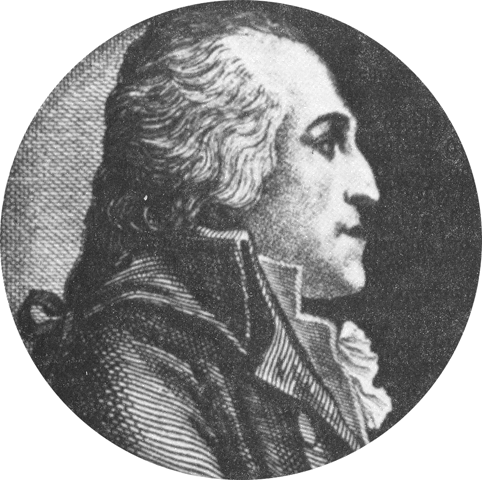
- Born: 8 March 1752; Wunsiedel, Bavaria, Germany
- Died: 10 September 1800 (aged 48); Bayreuth
- Other names: Johann David Schoepf; Johann David Schöpf
- Known for: Travels in the Confederation (1783–1784, English translation 1911); Historia testvdinvm iconibvs illvstrata (A Natural History of the Turtles)
- Scientific career
- Fields: Botanist, zoologist, physician
- Institutions: Ansbach regiment of Hessian troops fighting for King George III; United Medical Colleges of Ansbach and Bayreuth
- Author abbrev. (botany): Schoepff
- Author abbrev. (zoology): Schoepf(f)

Johann David Schoepff, or Schoepf, or Schöpf, (8 March 1752 – 10 September 1800) was a German botanist, zoologist, and physician.

He was born in Wunsiedel, Bavaria and travelled to New York in 1777 as the chief surgeon for the Ansbach regiment of Hessian troops fighting for King George III of the United Kingdom.

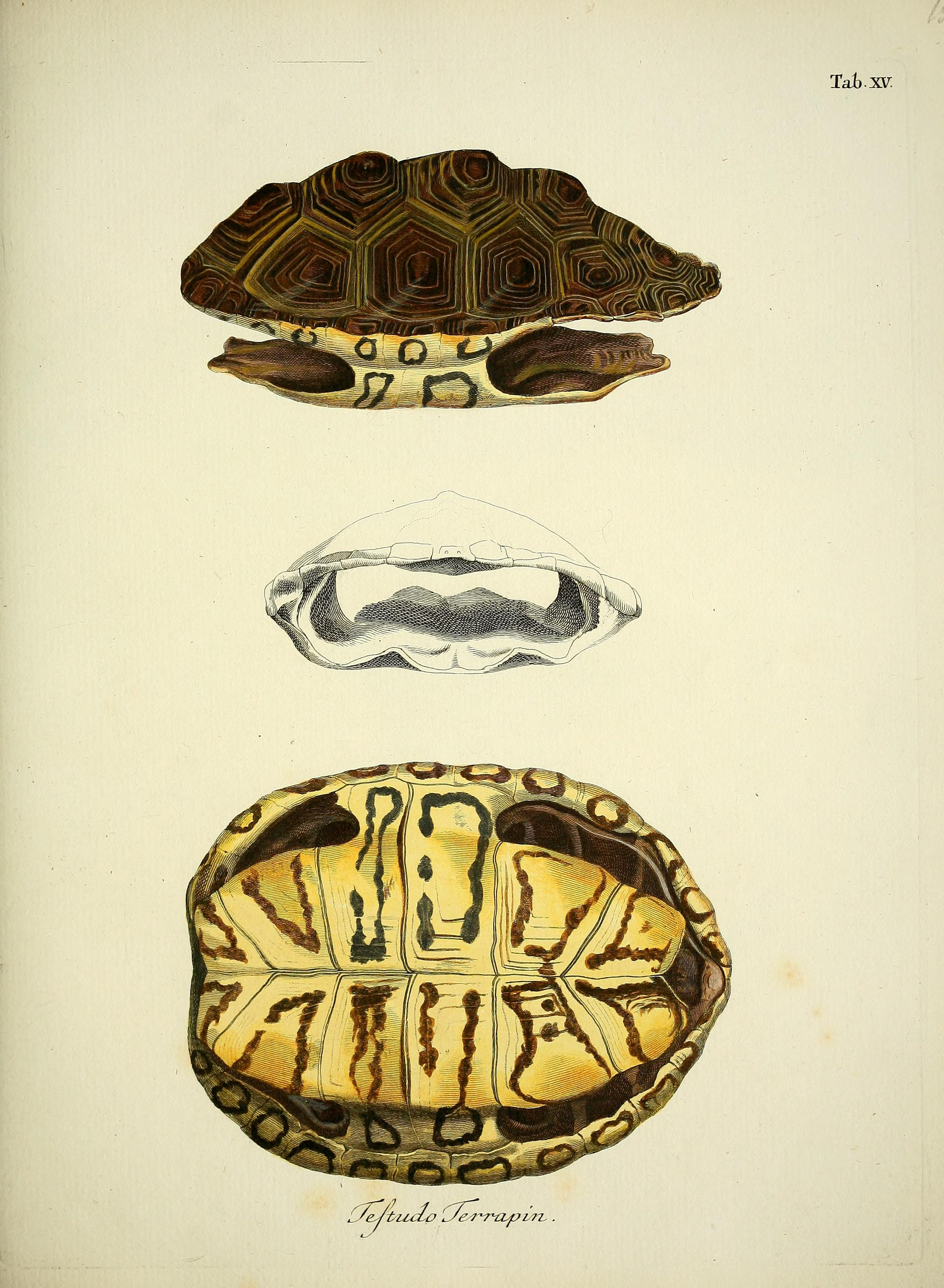
Diamondback terrapin (Malaclemys terrapin) Tab. XV (1793)

During the revolutionary war Schoepff was stationed in Rhode Island. Determined to study the Americas as a scientist once the war ended, he travelled for two years in the United States, British East Florida, and the Bahamas. In his writings about his travels in the U.S., he criticized slavery, writing, "The white men are all the time complaining that the blacks will not work, and they themselves do nothing."

He returned to Europe in 1784, where he worked for a time at the United Medical Colleges of Ansbach and Bayreuth. His North American observations are recorded in Travels in the Confederation [1783–1784], which first appeared in English translation in 1911. In 1792, he wrote Historia testvdinvm iconibvs illvstrata (A Natural History of the Turtles, Illustrated with Engravings), illustrated by Friedrich Wilhelm Wunder.

== Works ==
- Materia medica Americana potissimum regni vegetabilis . Lloyd Library, Cincinnati, Ohio 1903 (reproduction of the edition from 1787) Digital edition by the University and State Library Düsseldorf
- Schoepff, Johann David (1792). Historia testvdinvm iconibvs illvstrata [Illustrated History of the Turtles] (in Latin). OL 24395805M.
- Schoepff, Johann David (1792). Naturgeschichte der Schildkröten: mit Abbildungen erläutert [Natural History of Turtles: with Illustrations] (in German). Illustrated by Friedrich Wilhelm Wunder. Digital reproduction Zentral- und Landesbibliothek Berlin: http://nbn-resolving.de/urn:nbn:de:kobv:109-opus-72919
