= Crab trap =

Equipment for catching crabs

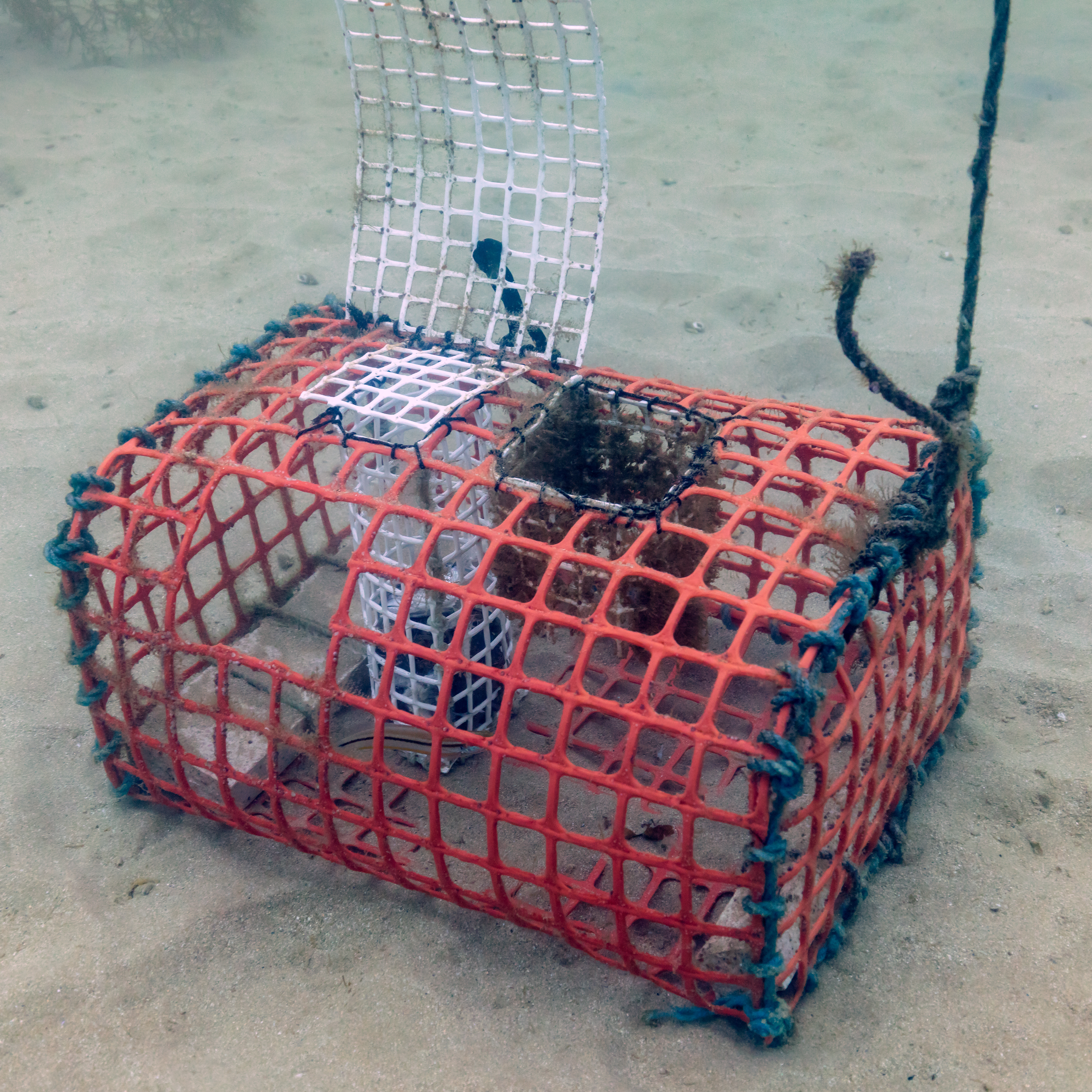
A Portuguese crab trap

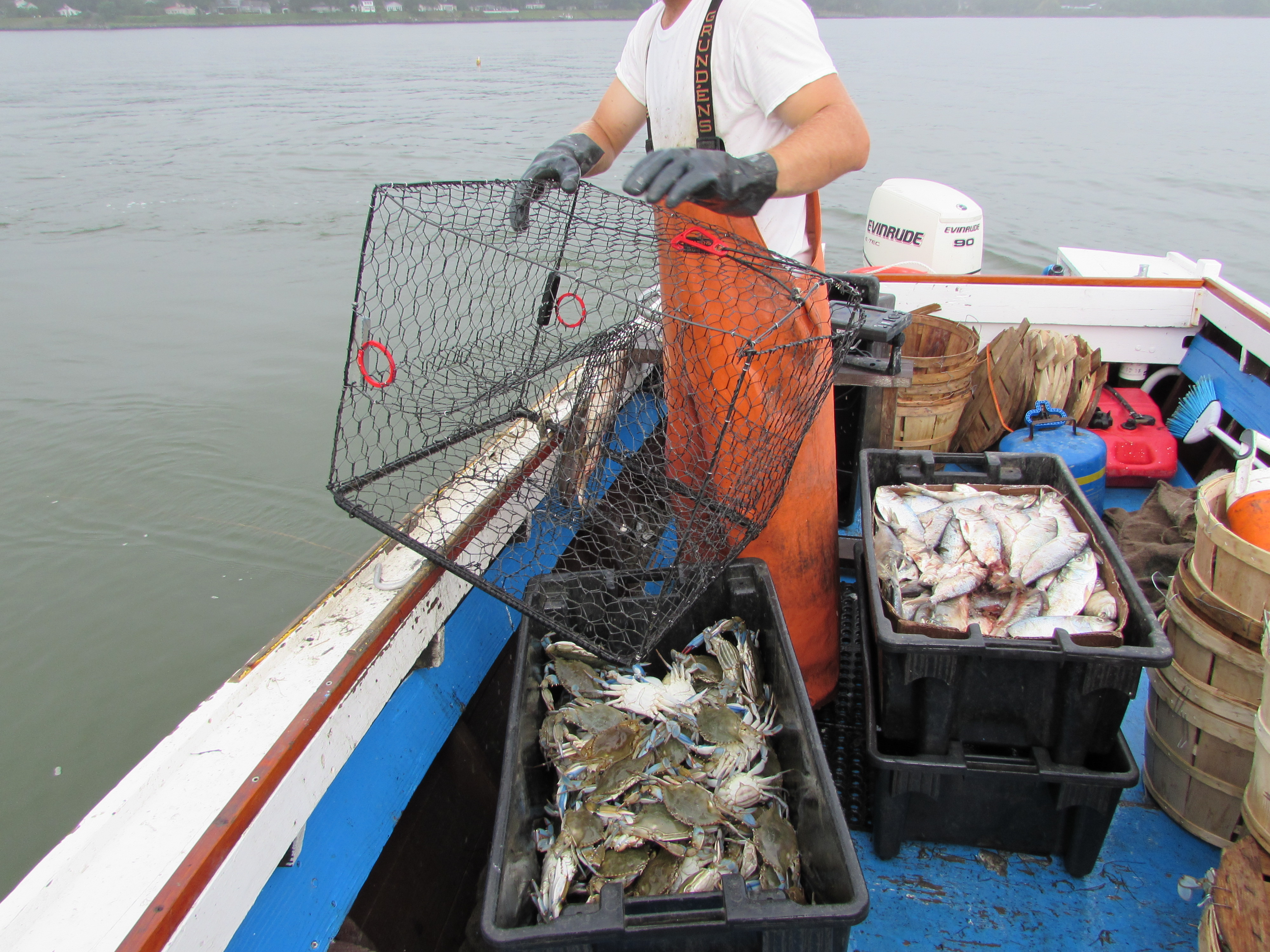
A crab trap, being used to catch blue crab

Crab traps are used to bait, lure, and catch crabs for commercial or recreational use. Crabbing or crab fishing is the recreational hobby and commercial occupation of fishing for crabs. Different types of traps are used depending on the type of crab being fished for, geographic location, and personal preference.

== History in the United States ==
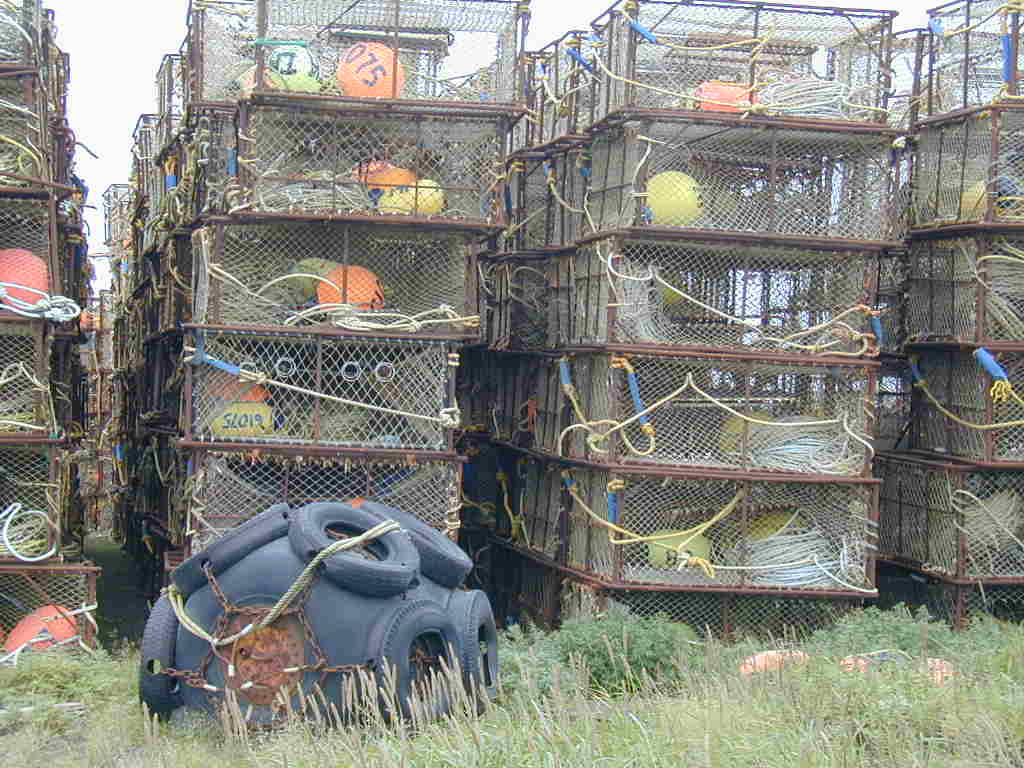
Crab traps in Alaska

Crab has been a viable food source since Native Americans lived and fished on the Delmarva Peninsula. The Chesapeake Bay, which is known for their Chesapeake Bay blue crabs (Callinectes sapidus) derives its name from "Chesepiook", a Susquehannock tribe word that means "Great Water". These Susquehannock natives led European settlers to some of the best places to catch crabs. Even early treaties between European settlers and Native Americans included provisions for the rights of "Hunting, Crabbing, Fowling, and Fishing." Since then, generations of watermen made their living harvesting crabs and other resources along the Chesapeake Bay developing the most efficient method to catch crabs resulting in modern crab traps.

Since early European settlers in America, crabbing was an important food source to watermen of the Chesapeake and continues to be the source of income for many families. The Alaskan king crab fishing industry took off in the mid-1800s, and was one of the reasons Alaskans pushed so hard for statehood in 1959. Alaskans wanted to gain control of the area's natural resources, such as king crabs.

Benjamin F. Lewis invented the crab pot in the 1920s, patented it in 1928, and perfected it ten years later. The crab pot changed the way crabs are harvested on the Chesapeake Bay. The crab pot is the most common method used to catch and harvest crabs worldwide.

Commercial crabbing is a dangerous industry. Thus, commercial crab traps catch as many crabs as possible to be able to remain commercially viable. Commercial crabbing is heavily regulated by local state laws to ensure that the crabs are not over fished and that they are given enough time to breed and repopulate.

Unlike normal traps, commercial crab traps are large in size; some can easily be over 60" in diameter, allowing the trap to hold a larger amount of crabs than recreational crab traps. Commercial crab traps also contain a small stainless steel plate like a dog tag, which identifies who the trap belongs to in case it is missed or swept by the current from its original location.

After World War II, Japanese crab vessels were competition for Alaskan king crab fishermen in the Bering Sea. Japanese crab vessels would crowd around cod boats, where king crabs devoured the fish waste. Ed Shields, a king crab fisherman was aboard a schooner at this time and recalls the Japanese encroaching on the Bristol Bay fishing area. Ed Shields says that his father sent a telegram to Seattle, ordering one dozen high-powered rifles for each vessel and one case of ammunition each.

Ed Shields states, "The coast guard didn’t care for this at all, the State Department didn’t care for it, but the news media did. It made good news. There’s no television at this time, but they did get in the national magazines like Time and Life. The adverse publicity to Japanese manufactured goods was so severe at that time from this campaign, the Japanese decided to pull out of Bristol Bay area and he sent a telegram saying, 'Bristol Bay is all clear now, Japanese gone home.'"

The Derelict Crab Trap Removal Program was created by the Louisiana Wildlife and Fisheries Commission in 2004. This was created to remove derelict crab traps from state-owned lakes and river-beds and to reduce the potential impact from these traps. There are also similar programs in other states. They are similar to the program in Louisiana where the traps are removed during a 30-day period. There are programs all over the Gulf Coast, including areas like Texas and Florida. These programs have also been successful with the help of volunteers working together, and over 30,000 derelict traps have been removed in Texas alone.

== Types ==
Pulling a crab pot in the Pacific just north of Garibaldi, Oregon

=== Maryland ===
The Maryland crab pot is an enclosed framework of wire with four openings. These openings are constructed so that when the crabs enter to eat the bait, they cannot escape, and instead become immediately trapped. Once the crab becomes trapped and cannot leave the same way they entered, they float upward and go through the openings of the inner wire portion, which permanently traps the crab.

The Maryland crab pot is a cube, generally two cubic feet and when baited and weighted, might weigh fifteen pounds or more. Sometimes it is left on the bottom for twelve to twenty-four hours or more. The end of the nylon rope is attached to a marked floating buoy so the location can be found and the pot retrieved. The Maryland crab pot is baited from the bottom with several oily fish. This is done by turning the pot on its side, stuffing the bait into the wire container, and closing the opening by securing the flap under the rubber tubing. The pot is then dropped into the water and when the crab fisher returns, pulls the pot up and into their boat.

=== West Coast ===
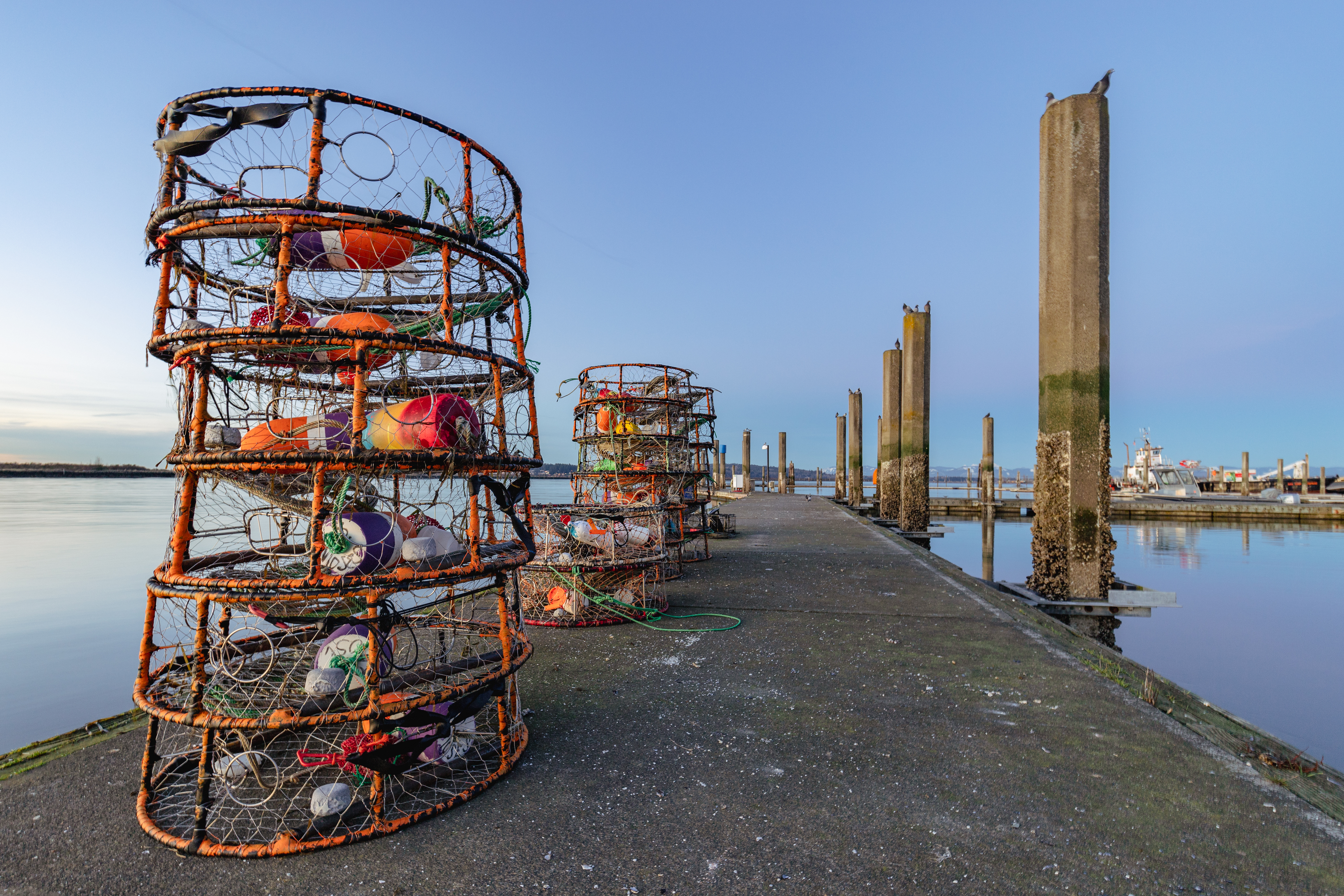
Stacks of West Coast style traps in Port Gardner Bay, Washington

West Coast crab pots, which are primarily used for catching Dungeness crabs, vary slightly from the Maryland style crab pot. When the crabs enter either of the two funnel-type openings in search of bait, they are unable to exit through these funnel openings and become entrapped in the pot.

=== Ring crab traps ===
Ring crab traps are very popular along the Oregon and Washington Coast. They are primarily used in river mouths and protected bays, but it is possible to use crab rings off the open shoreline. A crab ring is a simple piece of equipment that contains two wire rings that form the top and bottom of a collapsible basket. The lower ring is smaller than the upper ring and connected with a strong netting that forms the sides. Heavy chicken wire, cotton webbing or other suitable materials are used for the bottom.

After the bait is tied securely to the bottom of the basket, the lower basket sinks to the bay bottom where the sides collapse and the top and bottom rings lie together, leaving only a flat platform of tempting bait that the crab can easily reach. After the ring has been left on the bottom, the crabber raises the ring rapidly by pulling up with a rope, which prevents the crabs from escaping while the basket is pulled to the boat. While ring traps may allow crabs to escape more easily, their advantage is that they remain on the bottom for much shorter periods, typically a maximum of 20 minutes or so, versus the 30-45 minutes required for a crab pot to work effectively.

=== Pyramids ===
Pyramid crab traps are flat when lying on the bottom of the seafloor, but when raised to the surface, they form the shape of a pyramid. This trap is similar to the ring crab trap because there are no walls or cage that prevents the crabs from escaping before pulling it to the surface. The benefits of the pyramid crab trap over the ring crab trap is that the pyramid crab trap is slightly sturdier and can be used in waters with stronger currents.

=== Boxes ===
Box crab traps are made from a strong non-collapsible wire. The main advantages of this crab trap are that once the crab enters searching for the bait it cannot escape, guaranteeing a catch when the crab enters. Along with this comes the added bonus of not having to regularly check the trap. A downside of this trap is storing and transporting it since it does not collapse.

=== Trot lines ===
Trot line crab fishing was used exclusively by commercial crabbers from 1870 to 1929, but this method has since been almost entirely replaced by the use of crab pots and crab traps. A trotline is a baited, hook-less, long line that is usually anchored on the bottom and attached to anchored buoys. This trotline is baited and after some time, the fisherman pulls the trotline up with crabs hopefully biting on the bait.

== Environmental effects ==
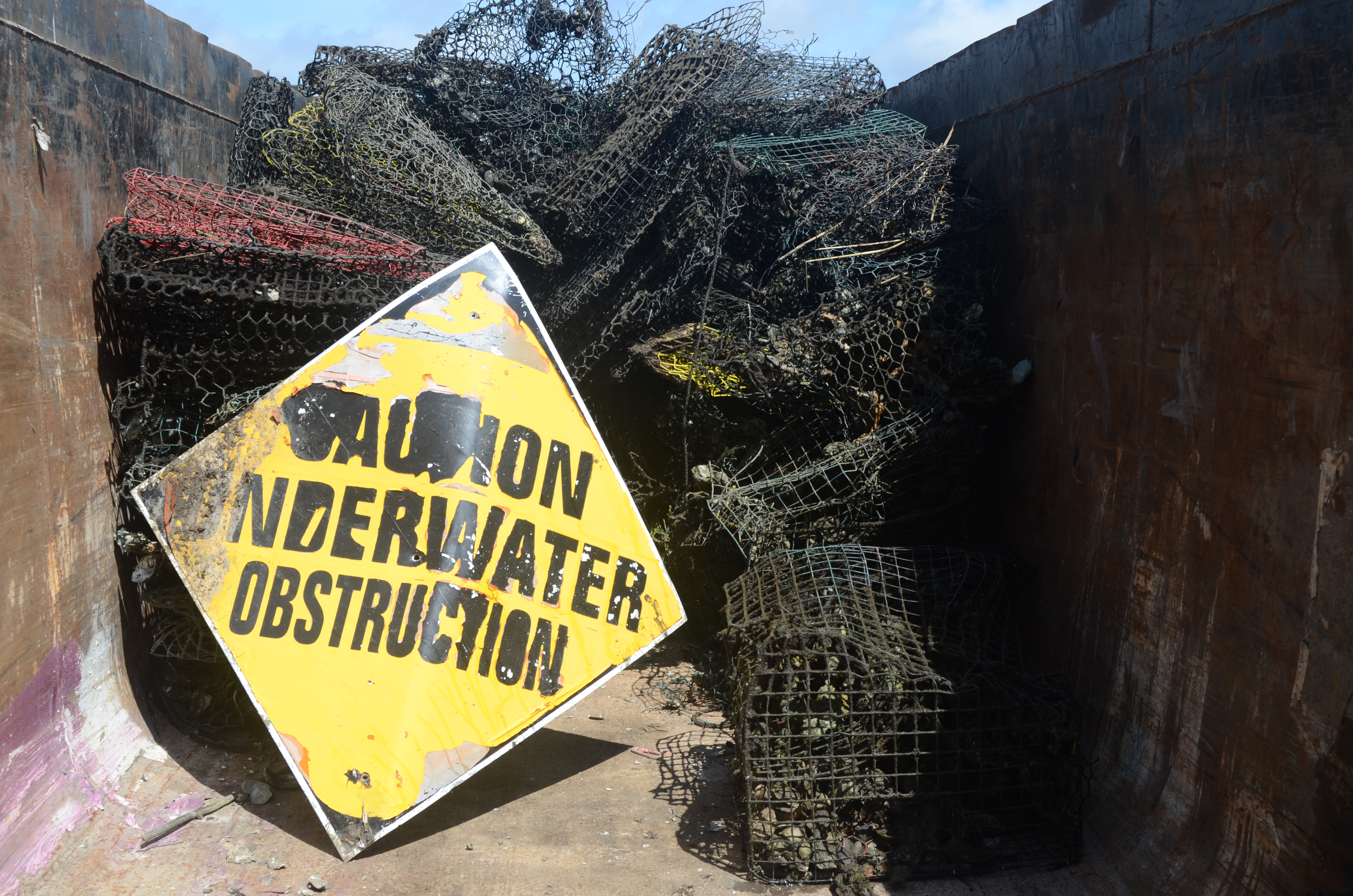
Pile of abandoned crab traps collected by volunteers as part of the Derelict Crab Trap Program in Louisiana

A crab trap which becomes lost or abandoned (usually by accidental detachment of the float) becomes an ongoing environmental hazard. Crabs will continue to enter this ghost trap to eat the bait, become trapped, and starve to death, attracting more crabs and other bottom-dwelling sea life; a single trap may kill dozens of crabs in this manner. For this reason, crab traps in many jurisdictions are required to have a "rot-out panel", a wooden panel the size of the largest entrance into the trap. This panel will disintegrate with a few weeks' exposure to seawater, opening the trap and allowing any crabs inside to escape. Other pots use biodegradable twine, that disintegrates within less than a week.

Whales become entangled in crabbing gear. They get entangled in the vertical lines between crab traps on the ocean floor and the surface buoys. For example, as of 2014 there was an increasing number of entanglements off the coasts of the United States. Management measures have been implemented by NOAA National Marine Fisheries Service.

== See also ==
- Fish trap
- Lobster trap
