= Derelict Crab Trap Program =

Environmental cleanup program in Louisiana, United States

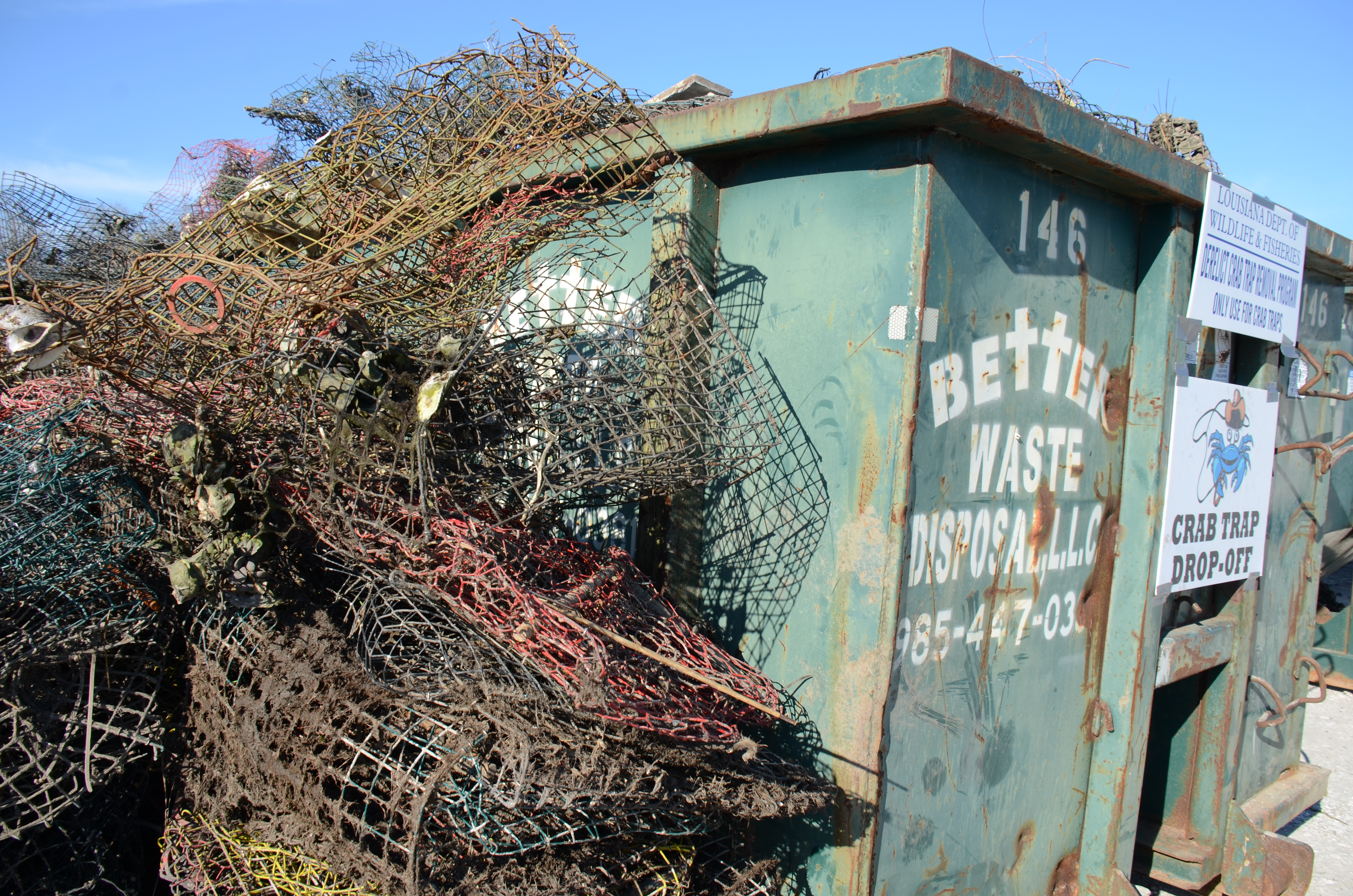
Abandoned crab traps collected during a cleanup event

The Derelict Crab Trap Removal Program was created by the Louisiana Wildlife and Fisheries Commission in 2004. This was created to remove derelict crab traps from state-owned lakes and river-beds and to reduce the potential impact from these traps. This program also collects data from all of the different animals that were found in the traps. It takes place in different areas of Louisiana usually between late February and early March.

This program is funded partially from sales of Louisiana crab fishing licenses and is run by the Louisiana Department of Wildlife and Fisheries, the Louisiana Sea Grant, and other volunteers of the area. During this time, the Commission and other volunteers will come together to remove these traps. Since 2004, volunteers have helped remove over 33,000 crab traps.

== History ==
Derelict crab traps are simply traps that have been lost or abandoned by fishermen. These traps were separated from their buoys by tides or currents, they were vandalized, or they were not assembled properly in the first place. Derelict crab traps can lead to "ghost fishing" or "ghost nets" where these traps continue to capture not only crabs, but many other kinds of species. Ghost fishing usually occurs in three steps. The first step is that the derelict traps grow barnacles. Then, the barnacles attract other fish and they get caught in the trap. Lastly, these fish become the bait for more crabs or other fish. This process turns into a cycle and is responsible for the death of many different kinds of species.

There has been some difficulty when it comes to removing these abandoned traps because it is illegal to remove them. Checking, running, or tampering with another person's trap in Louisiana is a serious offense and it can lead to a fine of $450-$500 and the possibility of going to jail for up to 120 days.

The Louisiana Wildlife and Fisheries decided to create a program so they can legally remove these traps and to include an educational element that will reduce the number of traps that are lost each year. Volunteers, staff members, and members of the commercial fishing industry come together over the course of 30 days, to remove the abandoned crab traps.

== Program success ==
Year	Areas	Total Traps Removed
2004	Upper Terrebonne Bay Estuary W. Vermilion Bay	6894
2005	Sabine Lake Breton Sound Estuary Middle Terrebonne Bay Estuary E.Vermilion Bay/West Cote Blanche Bay	4623
2006	SW Terrebonne Bay Estuary	2935
2007	E. Lake Pontchartrain Upper Barataria Bay Estuary	1498
2008	Upper Terrebonne Bay Estuary	1234
2009	Terrebonne Bay Estuary	788
2010	Upper Barataria Bay Estuary	477
2011	Western Plaquemines Parish	1100
2012	St. Bernard Parish Plaquemines Parish Terrebonne Parish	2708
2013	Plaquemines Parish St. Bernard Parish	969
2014	Western Terrebonne Parish	1051
2015	Cameron Parish	422
2016	St. Tammany Parish Orleans Parish Jefferson Parish Lafourche Parish	2580
2017	Eastern Louisiana Western Louisiana	5674

This table shows the total amount of derelict crab traps that were found in certain parts of Louisiana. Since 2004, a total of 33,040 crab traps have been removed.

In the 2010s, more and more people from different parishes and different foundations have come out to help remove these traps. This program now collaborates with volunteers, St. Bernard Parish, the Louisiana Department of Wildlife and Fisheries, the Coastal Conservation Association, Sweet Water Marina, and Boat Stuf. After the first volunteer day in 2017, Dr. John Lopez from the Lake Pontchartrain Basin said, "We estimate that over 130,000 crabs per year were saved with these efforts." The program has grown so much in the decade and it has traveled to many different places in Louisiana, ranging from Plaquemines Parish to Terrebonne Parish.

== Education and prevention ==
Even though thousands of traps have been removed in the past decade, there is still a long way to go to stop the rise of derelict crab traps. The Louisiana Sea Grant has created some tips to help prevent these traps.

- Always check line, knots, and buoys for proper function
- Avoid setting traps in navigational areas
- Make sure traps haven't drifted into areas of high traffic
- Properly discard unfishable traps.
- Attach a common float if you accidentally sever someone else's buoy line
- Remove traps before predicted major weather events
- If possible, use easily degradable cull rings or hog rings to prevent ghost fishing
- Secure traps to boat while navigating
- Report derelict traps

== Other programs ==
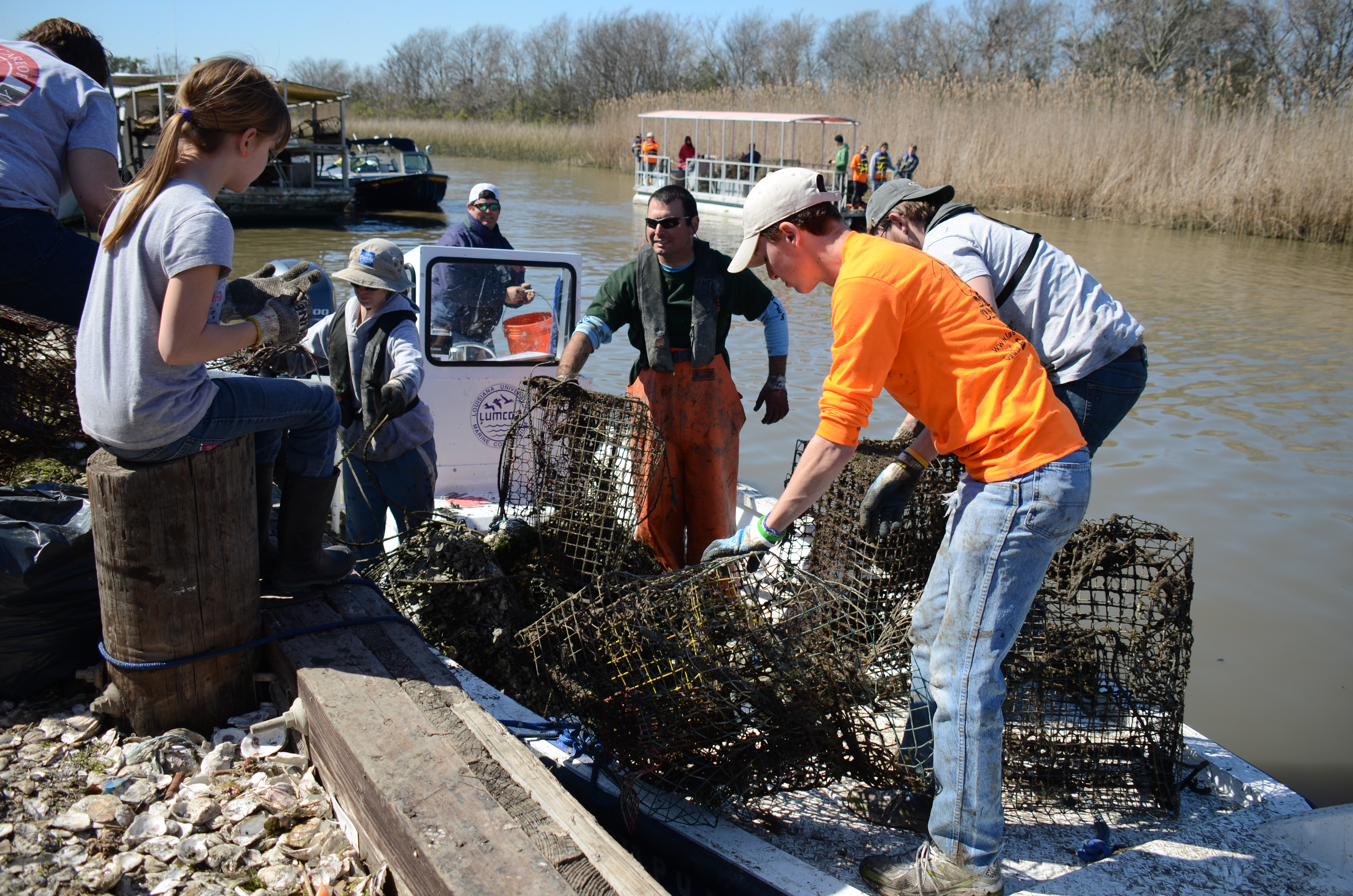
Volunteers on a "Crab Trap Rodeo" cleanup drive in 2014

The Derelict Crab Trap Removal Program is not the only program that collects and removes abandoned traps. There are "rodeos" that are run by the Louisiana Sea Grant and volunteers that will go out searching for these traps. They have been working with the Derelict Crab Trap Removal Program since 2016 and they have helped with the success of the program. These rodeos also have an educational element that teaches how to reduce the number of traps that are lost each year and how to lessen the impacts the traps have on the environment.

There are also other programs that are run in other states. They are similar to the program in Louisiana where the traps are removed during a 30-day period. There are programs all over the Gulf Coast, including areas like Texas and Florida. These programs have also been successful with the help of volunteers working together, and over 30,000 derelict traps have been removed in Texas alone. So each of these programs have been able to remove thousands of abandoned traps and save a countless number of crabs and other species in the process.
