= Edward Orton =

Edward Orton may refer to:

- Edward Orton Sr. (1829–1899), first president of Ohio State University
- Edward Orton Jr. (1863–1932), American academic administrator, businessman and ceramic engineer
