= Glaze defects =

Flaws in a ceramic glaze

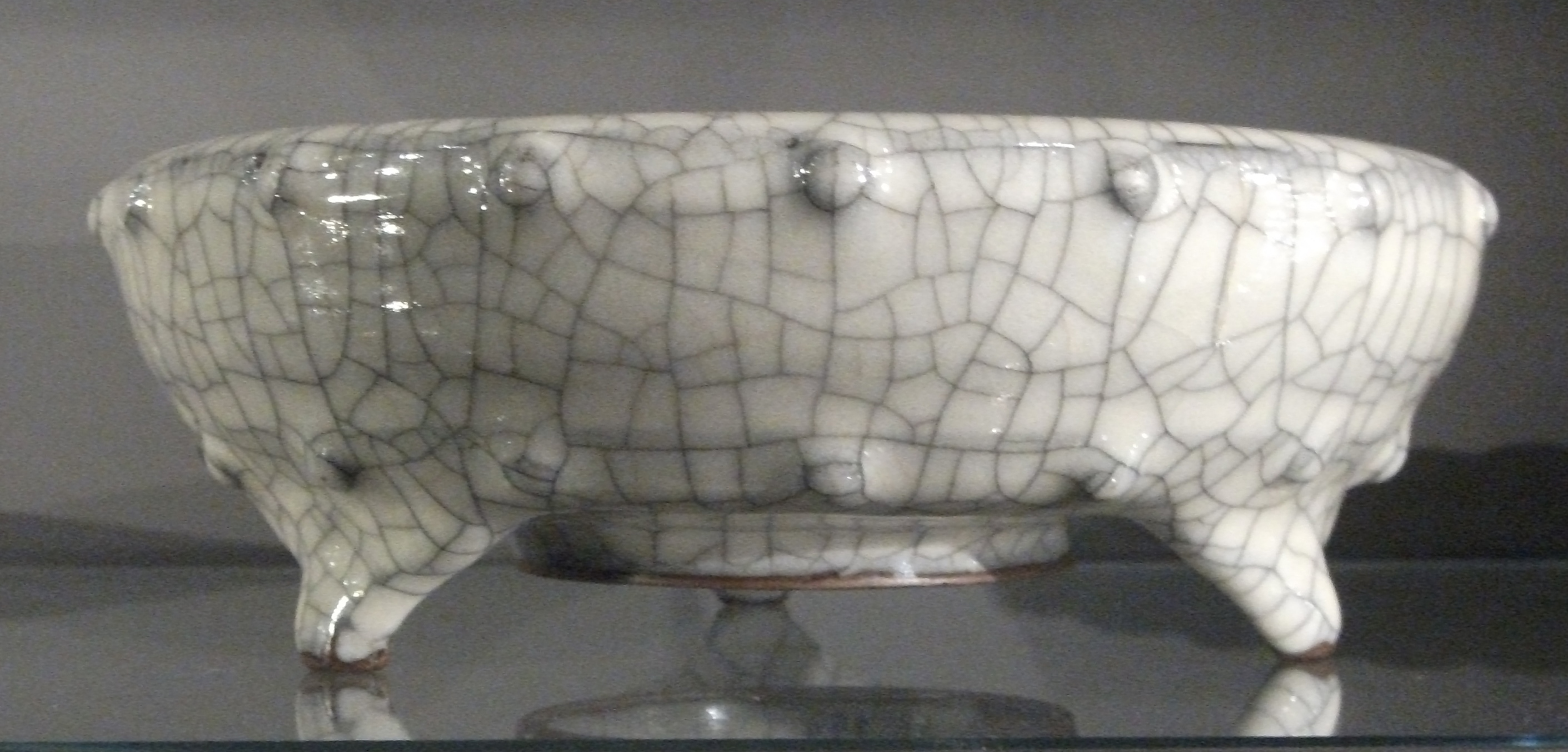
Small Guan ware bowl on legs, with pronounced, and in this case deliberate crackle in the glaze

Glaze defects are any perceived flaws in the surface quality of a ceramic glaze, its physical structure or its interaction with the body. What counts as a "defect" can be subjective depending on the ceramic tradition. For example, while crawling is often seen as undesirable, it is a characteristic feature of white Shino ware, known as yuzu-hada or "yuzu skin" due to its resemblance to the peel of the said fruit. In Japanese pottery, crackles in the ceramic glaze may also deepen in colour with use over time, e.g. from tea stains, much like the patina on copper objects.

== Glaze and body mismatch ==
Certain glaze defects are a result of differences in the thermal expansion coefficient of the glaze and the clay body.

=== Crazing ===
Crazing is a spider web pattern of cracks penetrating the glaze. It is caused by tensile stresses greater than the glaze is able to withstand. Common reasons for such stresses are: a mismatch between the thermal expansions of glaze and body; from moisture expansion of the body; and in the case of glazed tiles fixed to a wall, movement of the wall or of the bonding material used to fix the tile to the wall. The cracks can allow the ingress of water into the cracks. Once fired, ware tends to be more resistant to crazing due to better development of the glaze/body interfacial layer, which reduces stress gradients between the glaze and body.

In pottery a distinction is often made between crazing, as an accidental defect, and "crackle", which is when the same phenomenon, often strongly accentuated, is produced deliberately. The Chinese in particular enjoyed the random effects of crackle, though it spans a spectrum: in Ru ware it is a tolerated feature of most pieces, but not sought, while in Guan ware a strong crackle is a desired effect.

The causes of crazing include:

- Thermal expansion mis-match. Poor fit between the glaze and the body's thermal expansion is the main cause of crazing and can be due to:

- Under-firing resulting in failure to develop sufficient body thermal expansion.
- Firing too quickly, resulting in failure to achieve sufficient heatwork.
- Low thermal expansion body.
- High thermal expansion glaze.
- Over-firing of vitreous ware.

- Moisture expansion of the body. Porous bodies swell slightly due to absorption of moisture. Where glazes are in only slight compression this can be sufficient to bring them into tension. The problem results in delayed or secondary crazing, which occurs over a period of time after the ware has been produced.
- Glazing too thickly. This is a common cause of crazing. Glazes, which should be craze resistant, can craze if applied too thickly. This is because the further the glaze surface is away from the body, the lower the compression acting on it.
- Thermal shock. Opening the kiln too soon above 100 °C can cause crazing and dunting. Above 200 °C catastrophic failure can occur due to the volume changes at the cristobalite inversion (around 225 °C)

Steger's Crazing Test is a method for the assessment of the glaze fit. It is undertaken by measuring any deformation on cooling of a thin bar that was glazed only on one side. A common method of testing glazed ceramic ware for crazing resistance is to expose pieces of ware to steam in an autoclave at a minimum of 50 psi.

Seger's Rules are a series of empirical rules put forward by Hermann Seger for the prevention of crazing and peeling. To prevent crazing, the body should be adjusted as follows: decrease the clay, increase the free silica; replace some of the ball clay by kaolin; decrease the feldspar; grind the silica more finely; biscuit fire at higher temperature. Alternatively, the glaze can be adjusted: increase silica and/or decrease fluxes; replace some SiO_{2} by B_{2}O_{3}; replace fluxes of high equivalent weight by fluxes of lower equivalent weight. To prevent peeling, the body or glaze should be adjusted in the reverse direction.

=== Shivering ===
Shivering describes the breaking away of glaze from ceramic ware as a result of greater compression in the glaze layer than the body caused by the glaze having an expansion coefficient below the clay body's.

It is the opposite of crazing, as are the preventative steps: see Seger's Rule above. Shivering is also known as peeling.

== Metal release ==
Regulations have existed since the late 1960s to protect consumers from the potential risk of toxic materials, mainly metals, being released from glazes into drink and foodstuffs. Lead and cadmium are the metals of greatest concern, although testing can be extended to include others. The propensity for any glaze to release metal may depend on complex interactions between the formulation used, any applied decoration and the kiln atmosphere.

Monitoring the level of metal release from glazed ware forms part of the quality control procedures of all reputable producers. Test methods are specified according to national and international standards, although testing usually involves: the ware being immersed or filled with a 4% acetic acid solution; covered and left for 24 hours at room temperature, although if cooking ware is being tested higher temperatures are needed; the acetic acid solution decanted from the ware and the concentration of leached metal measured by Atomic absorption spectroscopy. Acceptance limits are enforced by legislation, and whilst varying between countries all are within the ppm range. Some of the most well recognised legislation are: across Europe 'EC Directive 84/500/EEC 1984'; for the UK 'GB Ceramic Ware (Safety) Regulations SI 1647, 1988'; and for the USA 'FDA Compliance Policy Guide 7117.06 and 7117.07 for cadmium and lead.'

== Glaze surface defects ==
=== Blisters ===
A large bubble sometimes present as a fault in ceramic ware. Blisters appear as large bubbles either just below or penetrating the surface, leaving sharp, rough edges that collect dirt. The surface of the glaze is very unpleasant and looks like a boiled mass of bubbles, craters and pinholes.

=== Crawling ===
A defect that appears as irregular, bare patches of fired body showing through the glaze where it has failed to adhere to or wet the body on firing. The cause is a weak bond between glaze and body; this may result from greasy patches or dust on the surface of the biscuit ware or from shrinkage of the applied glaze slip during drying. The fault is more likely to occur with once-fired ware such as sanitaryware.

=== Metal marking ===
Metal marks are dark lines, often accompanied by damage in the glaze, caused by the deposition of metal during the use of metal utensils. The cutlery, or other relatively soft metal, will leave a very thin smear of metal on pottery ware if the glaze is minutely pitted. A glaze may have this defective surface as it leaves the glost kiln, or it may subsequently develop such a surface as a result of inadequate chemical durability. The fault is also known as cutlery marking.

=== Pin-hole ===
A fault that is commonly the result of a bubble in the glaze when it was molten that burst but was only partially healed. The bubbles are most often from gas that originates from air trapped between the particles of powdered glaze as the glaze begins to mature, or from gases evolved from carbonate compounds.

A specific example of pin-holes is Spit-out. These are pin-holes or craters sometimes occurring in glazed non-vitreous ceramics while they are in the decorating kiln. The cause of this defect is the evolution of water vapour, adsorbed by the porous body, during the period between the glost firing and the decorating firing, via minute cracks in the glaze.
