= Pyrometric device =

Pyrometric devices gauge heatwork, the combined effect of both time and temperature, when firing materials inside a kiln. Pyrometric devices do not measure temperature, but can report temperature equivalents. In principle, a pyrometric device relates the amount of heat work on ware to a measurable shrinkage or deformation of a regular shape.

Care should be taken with the interpretation, as some naively assume they are a measure of temperature alone.

== Types ==
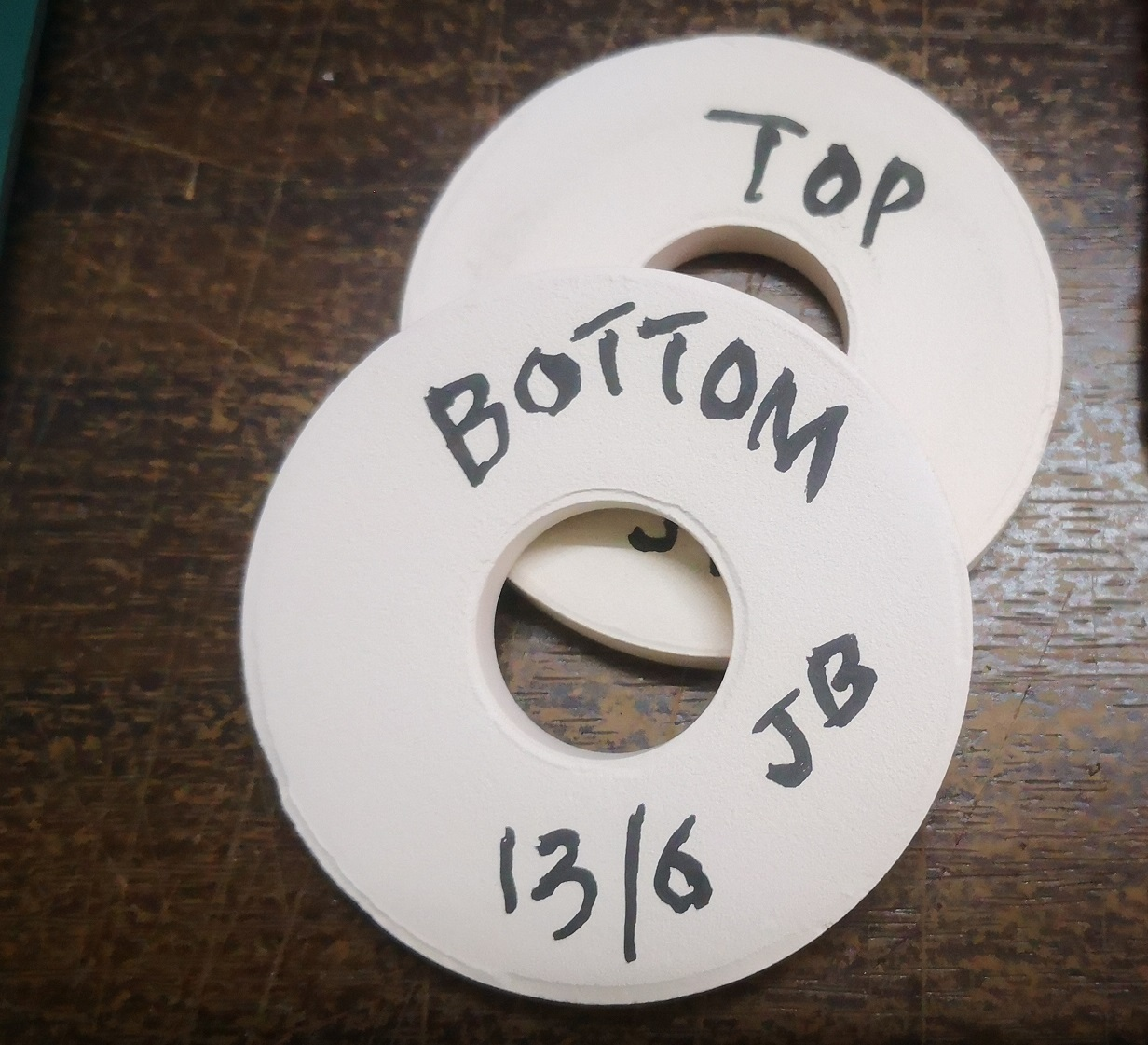
Buller Rings that were placed at top and bottom of a kiln

Rings
Rings are flat, hollow centred discs whose contraction is proportional to the heat work experienced. A micrometer or gauge measures the fired ring, with the difference being an arbitrary number that is used to describe the firing regime experienced. Various grades of ring, each of slightly different compositions, are available to cover all firing conditions and temperature equivalents likely to be encountered. Examples of pyrometric rings include Bullers Rings, PTCR Rings and Thermorings.

Bars
Bars are square sectioned, and mounted horizontally across two fixed distance supports. During firing the softening of the material results in sagging at the centre. Pyrometric Bars have found popularity in Kiln Sitters, which uses the described deformation to act as a triggering element, thus turning off the kiln at a desired point of maturity. Examples of pyrometric Bars include Holdcroft Bars and "Orton Bars".

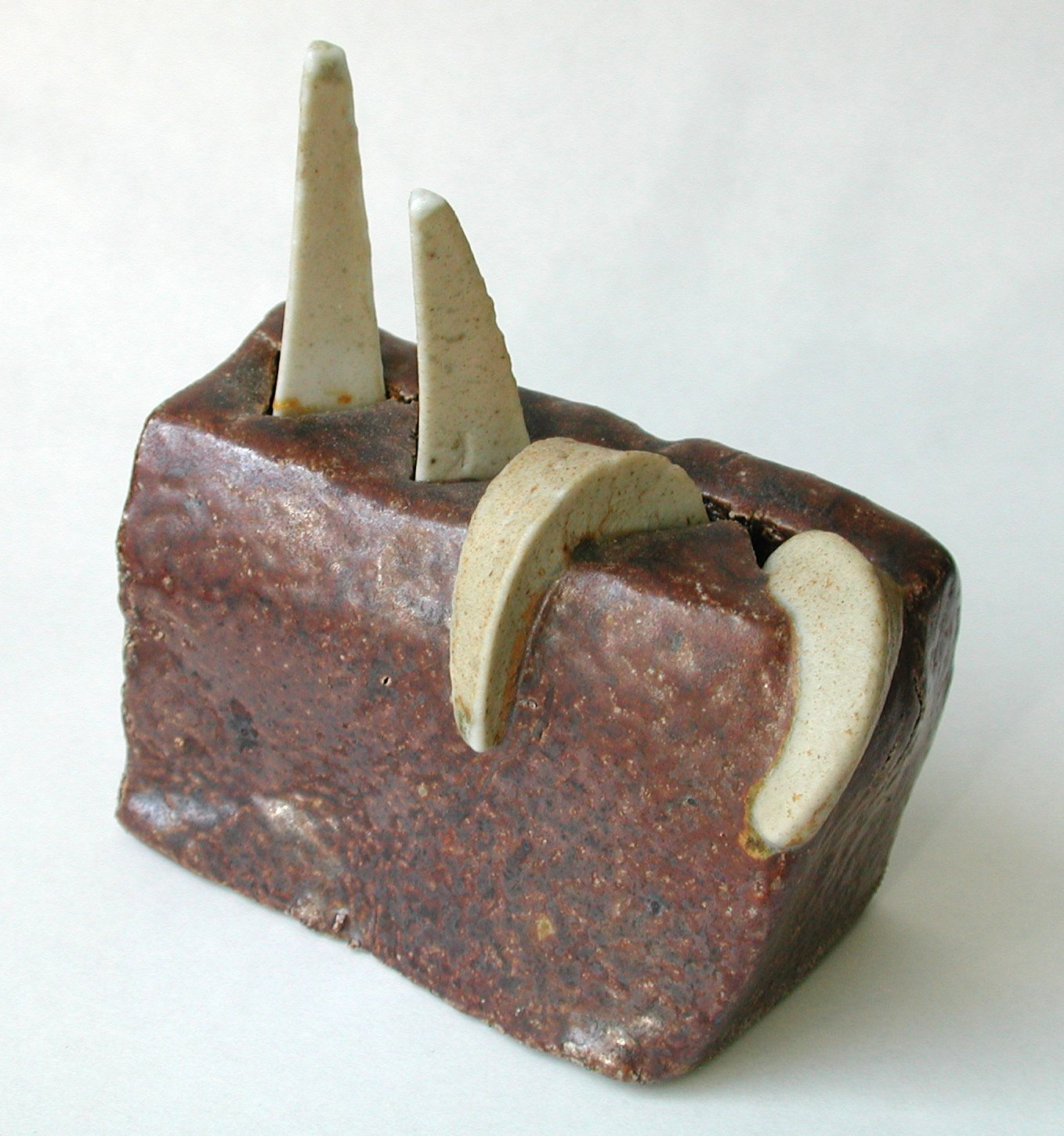
Four Seger cones after use

Cones
Cones are slender, three sided pyramids that are made from a range of compositions, each composition with a reference number corresponding to a certain heat work. Rather than shrink as rings do, a cone's tip will bend forward to the same level as the base at the time of maturity. Other deformations of a cone, such as bloating, cracking or bending backward, can be appropriately interpreted to troubleshoot activity inside the kiln.

Discs
Are calibrated ceramic disc-shaped devices. Examples include Bullers Process Control Discs and TempCHEKS.

== History ==
In 1782, Josiah Wedgwood created an accurately scaled pyrometric device working (see Wedgwood scale for details), with details published in the Philosophical Transactions of the Royal Society of London in 1782 (Vol. LXXII, part 2). This led him to be elected a fellow of the Royal Society.

The modern form of the pyrometric cone was developed by the German ceramics technologist Hermann Seger and first used to control the firing of porcelain at the Königliche Porzellanmanufaktur (Royal Porcelain Works) in Berlin, in 1886. Seger cones are still made by a small number of companies and the term is often used as a synonym for pyrometric cones.

Holdcroft Bars were developed in 1898 by Holdcroft & Co.

Bullers rings have been in continuous production for over 80 years, and are currently in use in over 45 countries. Originally developed by the company named Bullers, the current manufacturers, Taylor Tunnicliff Limited, were founded in 1867.

The Standard Pyrometric Cone Company was founded by Edward J. Orton, Jr. in 1896.

PTCR rings (Process Temperature Control Rings) were originally called "Phillips Temperature Control Rings" and developed by Phillips Electronics in Uden, Netherlands. The plant is now owned by Ferro and moved to its current location in St Dizier, France in 2010.
