= University Hall (Ohio State University) =

Campus building of Ohio State University

- Formerly listed on the U.S. National Register of Historic Places
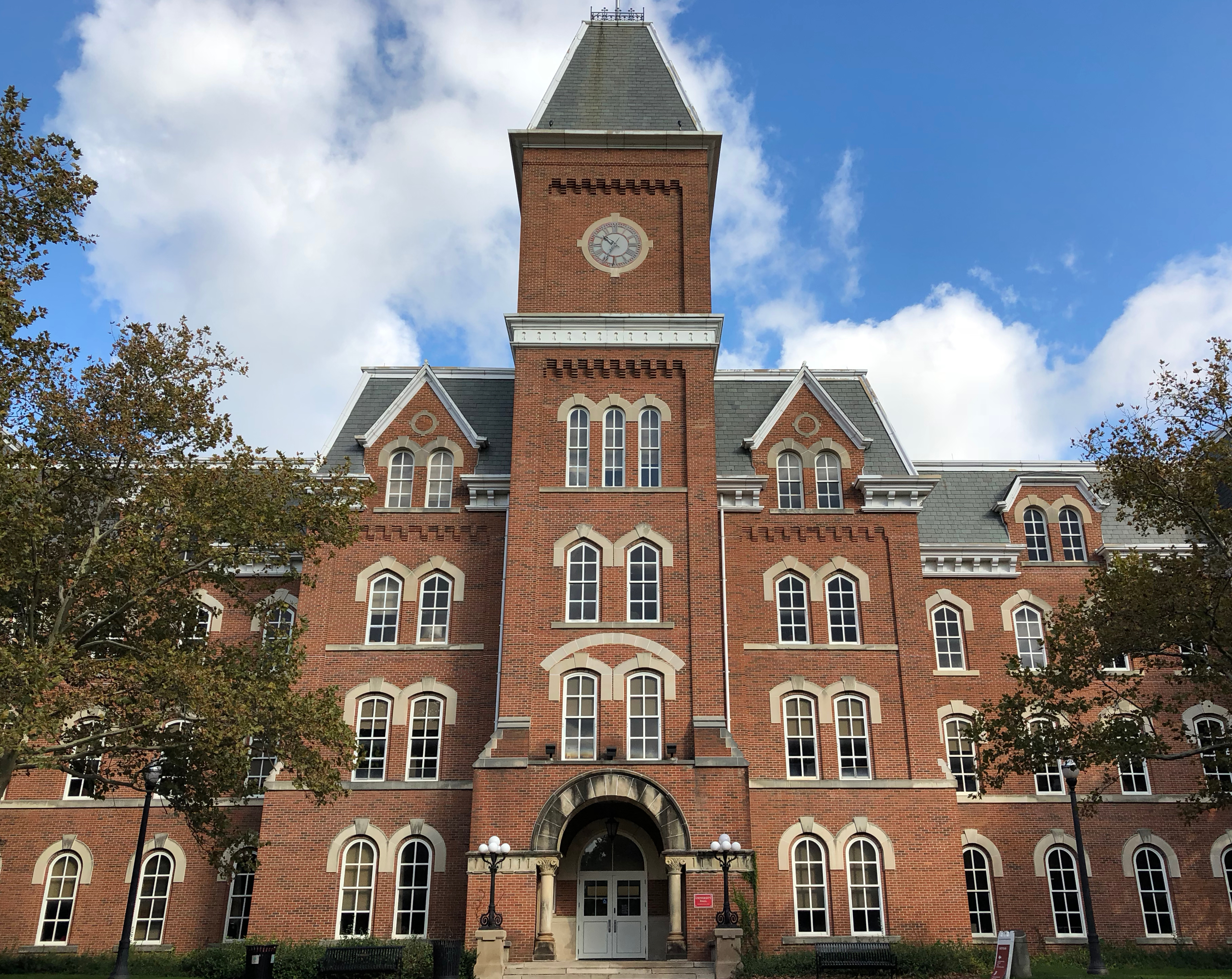
- The present-day University Hall
- Interactive map highlighting the building's location
- Location: 230 N. Oval Mall, Columbus, Ohio
- Coordinates: 40.000502°N 83.014432°W
- Built: 1873
- Architect: Jacob Snyder
- Architectural style: High Victorian Gothic
- Demolished: 1971 (replaced in 1976)
- Part of: University, Hayes and Orton Halls
- NRHP reference No.: 70000492

Significant dates
- Added to NRHP: July 16, 1970
- Removed from NRHP: October 1971

University Hall is the main academic building at the Ohio State University in Columbus, Ohio. The building houses classrooms for several of the university's colleges and includes a museum on the ground floor.

The present-day University Hall is the second of its name on the site; the original was built in 1873 as the first permanent building for Ohio State, and the first instructional and administrative building. The original structure was listed on the National Register of Historic Places in 1970 and demolished in 1971. In 1976, it was replaced by a modern academic building that replicates the original's architecture.

== Attributes ==
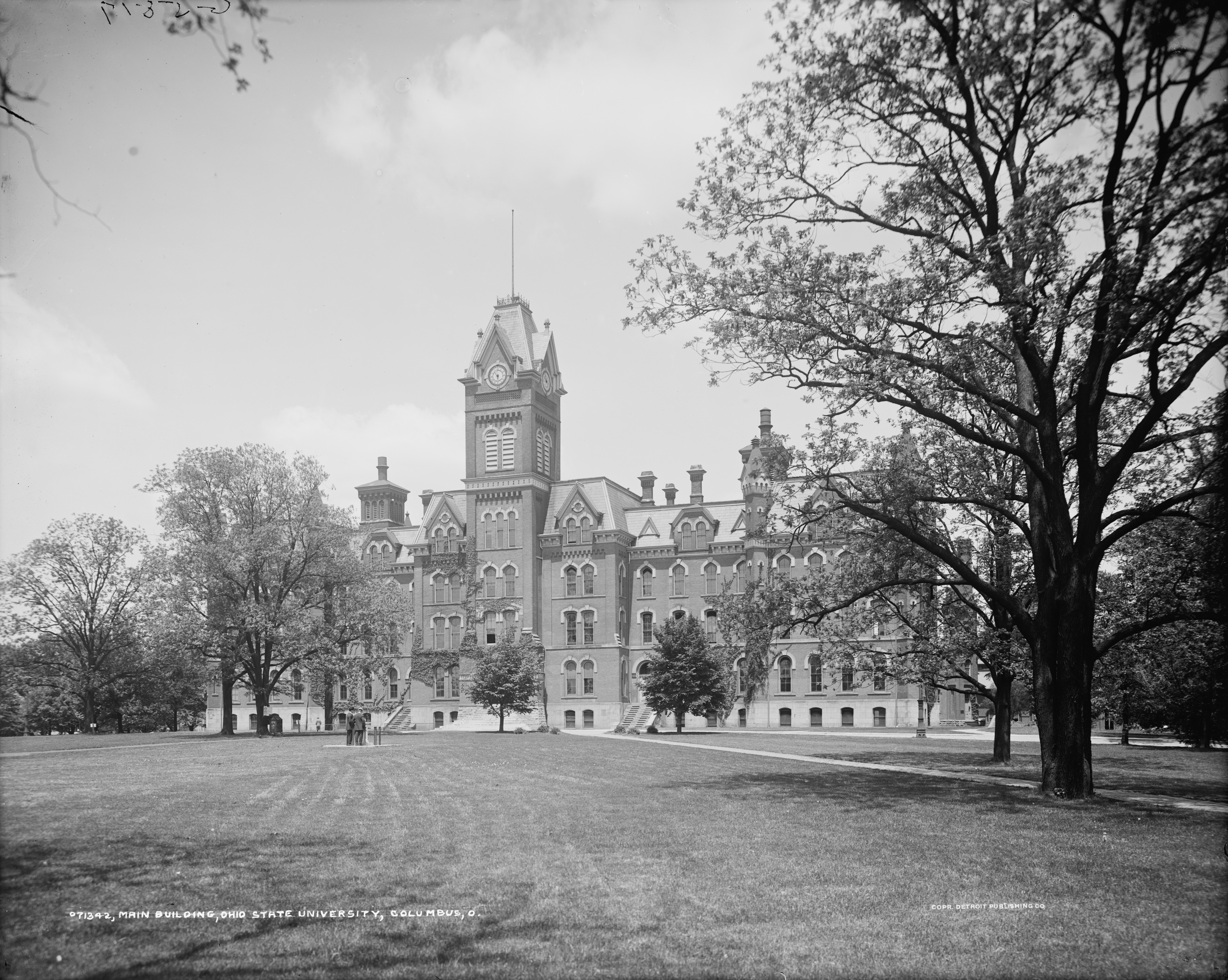
The original University Hall, c. 1900–1910

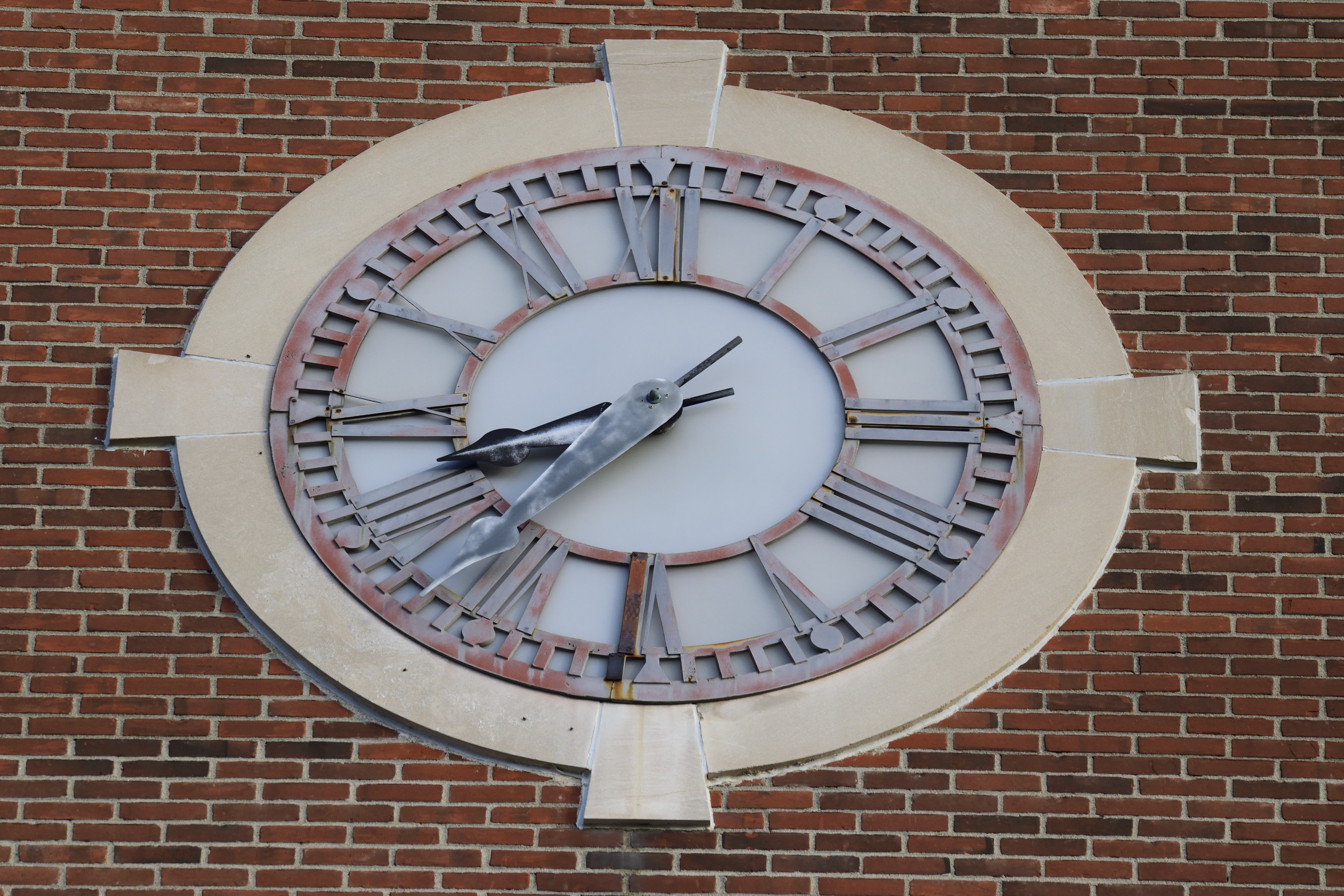
Street-level view of the current south clock

The original University Hall was designed in the High Victorian Gothic style by Jacob Snyder, a prominent architect from Akron, Ohio. It was the first academic building for an Ohio college to stray from the Yale Report of 1828, which directed buildings to be designed in classical styles. University Hall is considered a noteworthy prototype for the Collegiate Gothic style that followed.

Both the original and current building occupy a site on the northwestern corner of the Oval, the university's main quad.

=== Exterior ===
As originally built, the building had a five-story bell tower, altered twice before its demolition. The facade has three sections – a primary section in the center, with east and west wings at the side. A clock tower is situated in the center of the building, directly above the main entrance.

=== Interior ===
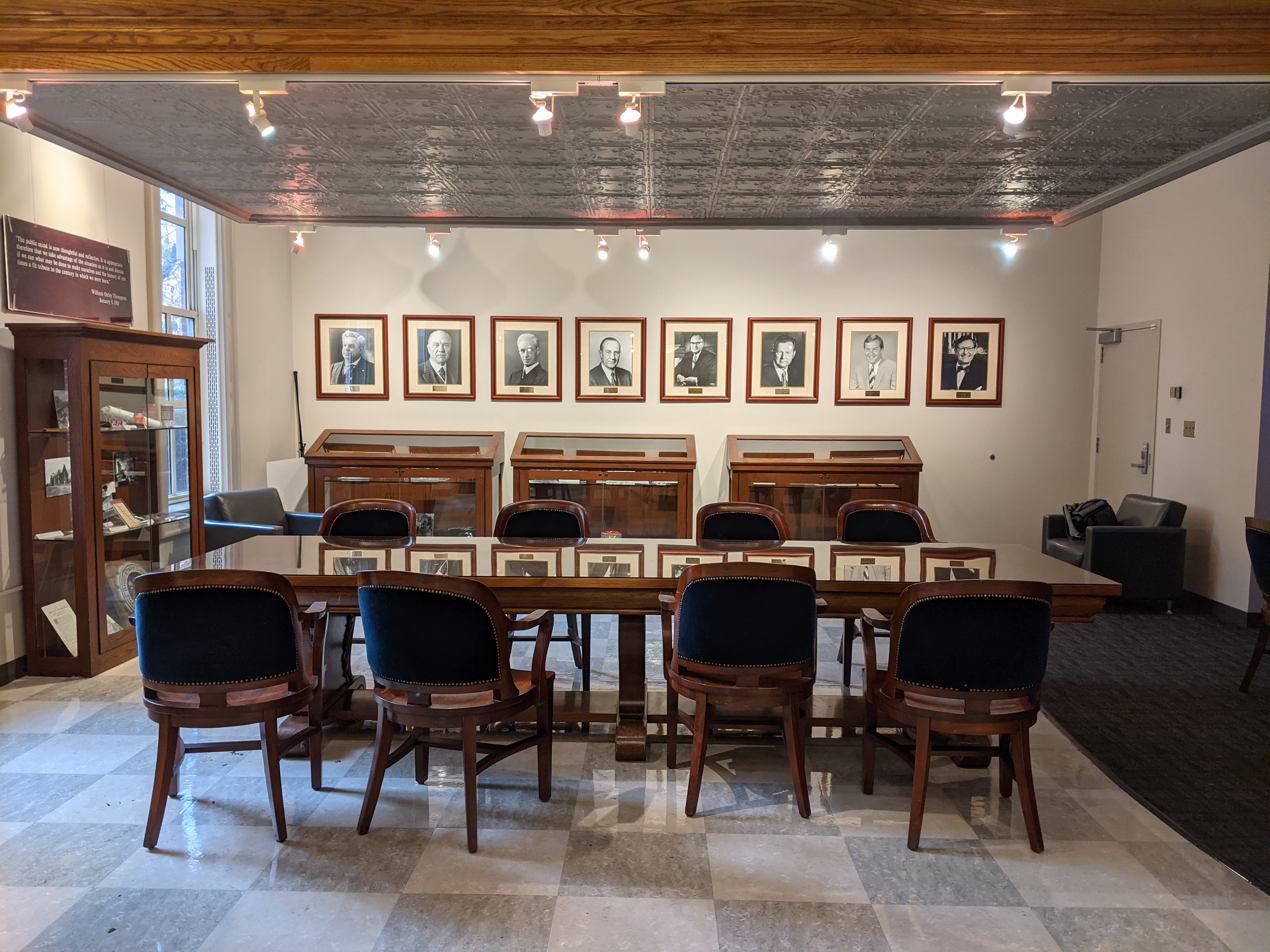
The University Museum

The building originally featured wide corridors, along with offices and classrooms. It included 48,000 sq ft (4,500 m^{2}) of floor space. The first floor and east wing basement originally held student housing, while the west wing basement held the mechanical engineering department (later home to the print shop, which produced The Lantern). The basement also held a cafeteria and armory at its opening. Faculty housing was on the upper floors. Classrooms, a chapel, debate rooms, a geologic museum, and a library were maintained elsewhere in the building.

The building currently houses classrooms for the College of Arts and Sciences, Department of African American and African Studies (fourth floor), Department of Classics, Department of Philosophy (third floor), Department of Women's, Gender and Sexuality Studies, and The Graduate School (both on the second floor).

The current building also houses the University Museum, a free and public collection of memorabilia, photographs, and relics from the original building. The museum was established in 2001, and moved into the building's room 143 in 2007. It was established in a collaboration between the university archives and Ohio Staters, a community service and leadership student organization.

== History ==
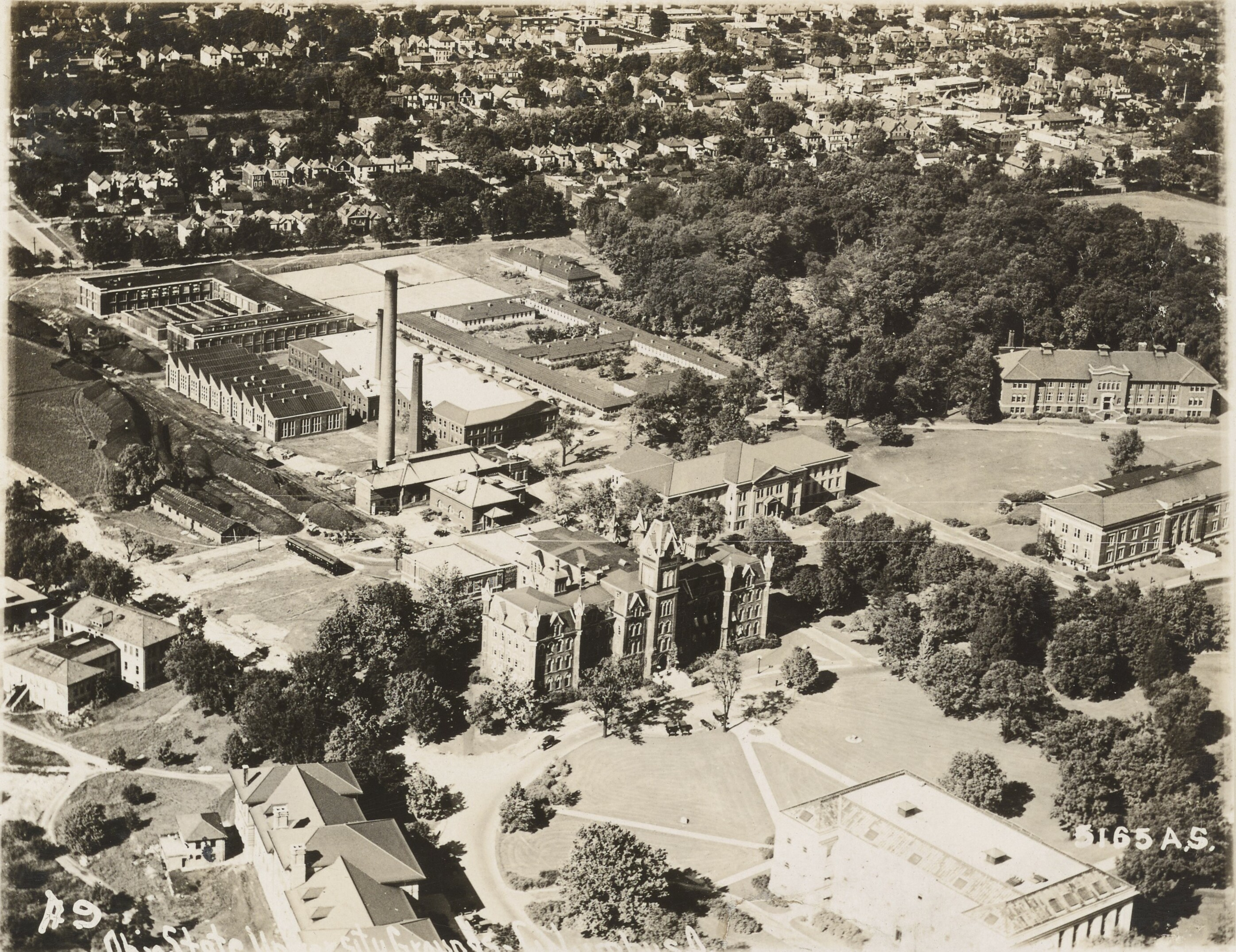
Aerial view, 1919

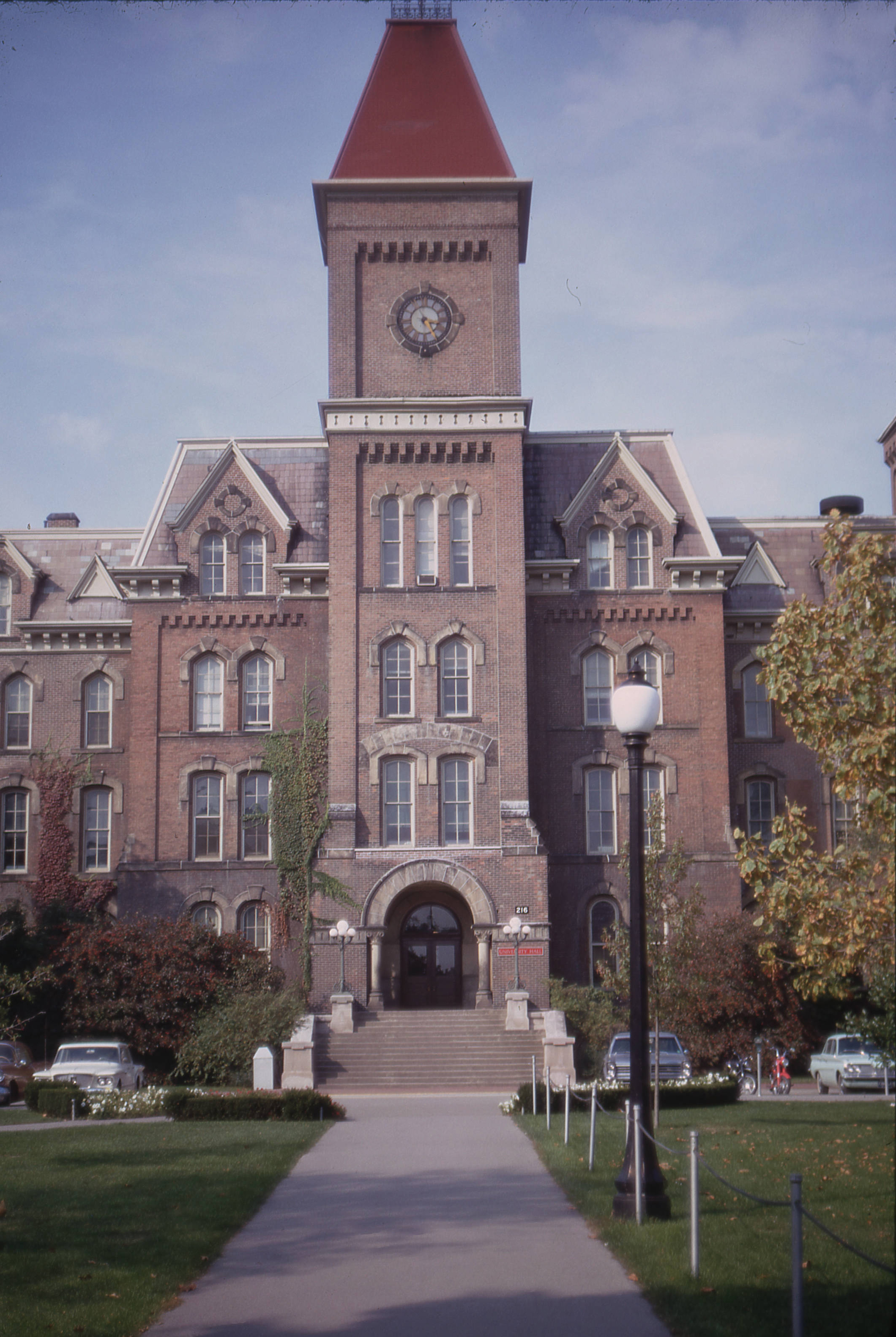
The building in 1968

The original University Hall was constructed in 1873, a year later than anticipated due to issues transporting brick and limestone to the site. Upon completion, University Hall contained a majority of the university functions, including both student and faculty housing. It was the first permanent building, as well as the first used for educational purposes at the school, founded in 1870. From 1873 to 1879, the building housed all instructional and administrative functions for Ohio State.

In 1885, University Hall briefly housed the first state museum.

Throughout the original building's life, it hosted commencement ceremonies, as well as those for the Sphinx honor society and initiations for the Mortar Board and Chimes societies. The building was also host to two marriages, a birth, and three funerals.

In the 1960s, the building began to show a few signs of deterioration, including sagging floors in the north wing. University officials were concerned about a potential fire. The building was closed in May 1968. Ohio State considered just demolishing the un-original north wing, though eventually found it best to replace the entire building.

In 1970, University Hall was listed on the National Register of Historic Places, as part of the University, Hayes and Orton Halls nomination: one of three original structures remaining on the OSU campus, each with notable architectural and historical merits. The nominator, then director of the Ohio Historical Society, wished that the nomination would certify the building's significance, as part of the fight against its proposed demolition. After being closed in 1968 for safety reasons, the building was slated for demolition in 1970, while serving as a symbol for the university's centennial that year. It was completely torn down in 1971. The building was removed from the register in that year. The register nomination completed in 1970 claimed the building was in good shape, with little sign of settling walls or rotting timber, with the only unsafe portion a rear auditorium addition dating to the early 20th century.

The current University Hall was reconstructed in its place, taking a similar exterior appearance to the original building (including retaining the prior building's tower clock, entranceway arch, and pillars), but updating the inner workings. Notable exterior differences include elimination of the east and west entrances and chimneys. The new building was completed in 1976.

== See also ==
- National Register of Historic Places listings in Columbus, Ohio
