= Pyrometric cone =

Kiln temperature indicating device

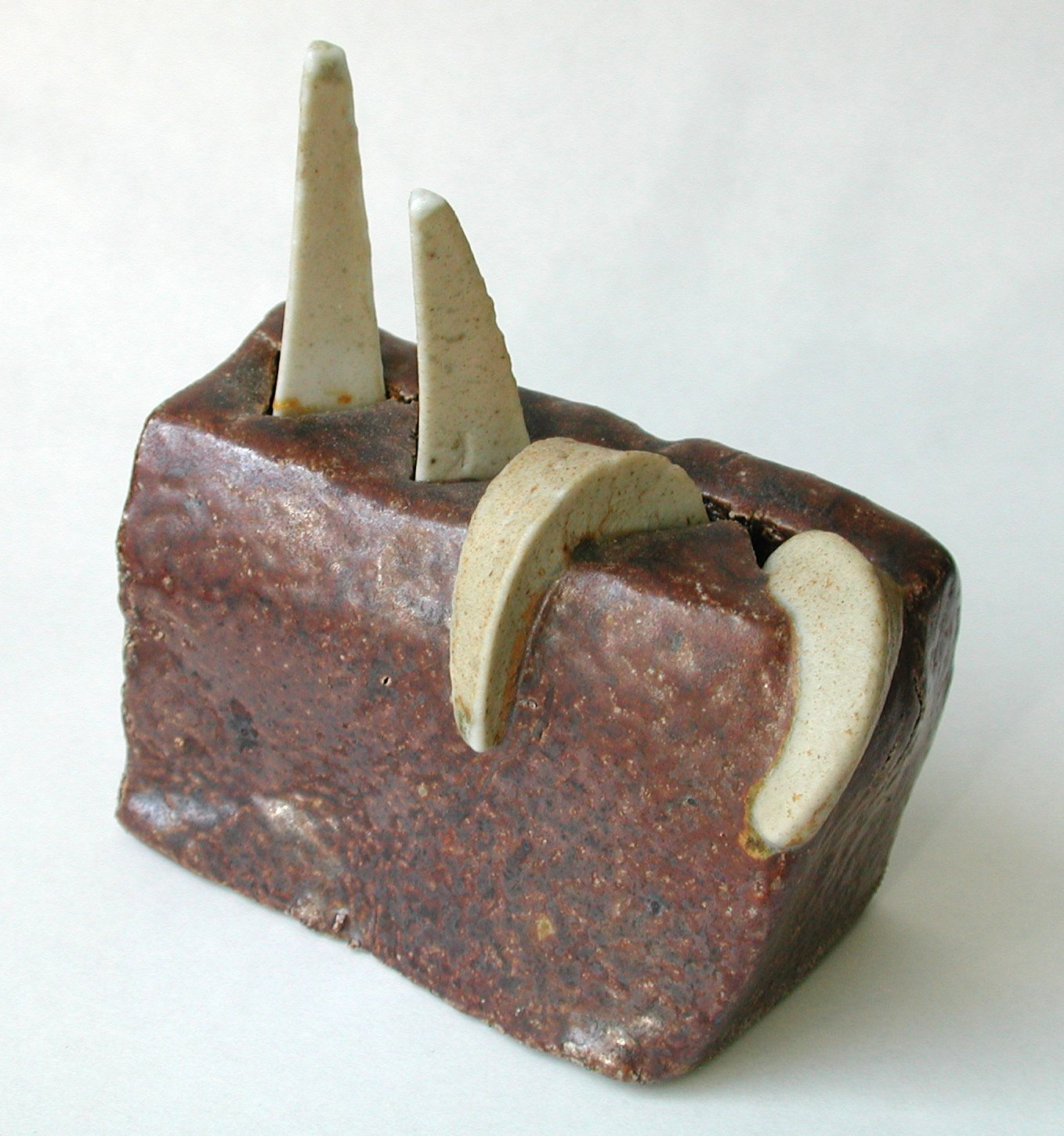
Four Seger cones after use

Pyrometric cones (witness cones) are pyrometric devices that are used to gauge heatwork during the firing of ceramic materials in a kiln. The cones, often used in sets of three, are positioned in a kiln with the wares to be fired and, because the individual cones in a set soften and fall over at different temperatures, they provide a visual indication of when the wares have reached a required state of maturity, a combination of time and temperature.

Pyrometric cones give a temperature equivalent; they are not simple temperature-measuring devices.

== Definition ==
The pyrometric cone is "a pyramid with a triangular base and of a defined shape and size"; the "cone" is shaped from a carefully proportioned and uniformly mixed batch of ceramic raw materials so that when it is heated under stated conditions, it will bend due to softening. The angle of the tip gradually increases from 0° (upright) until it touches the support surface (90° angle), indicating that a definitive temperature has been reached based on the heating parameters. Pyrometric cones are made in series to indicate incrementally higher or lower temperatures.

== Usage ==
For some products, such as porcelain and lead-free glazes, it can be advantageous to fire within a two-cone range. The three-cone system can be used to determine temperature uniformity and to check the performance of an electronic controller. The three-cone system consists of three consecutively numbered cones:

- Guide cone – one cone number cooler than firing cone.
- Firing cone – the cone recommended by manufacturer of glaze, slip, etc.
- Guard cone – one cone number hotter than firing cone.

Most kilns exhibit inherent temperature gradients between the upper and lower chambers. The magnitude of this thermal variance is influenced by the kiln’s structural design, the depletion level of the heating elements, the density of the load distribution, and the specific pyrometric cone target. Typically, these disparities are more pronounced during lower-temperature firings. To accurately map these thermal profiles, pyrometric cones should be positioned on the lower, middle, and upper shelves. Analysing the results allows for strategic adjustments in loading patterns and firing schedules to achieve greater uniformity. Furthermore, the installation of a downdraft venting system can significantly mitigate temperature fluctuations by circulating air more effectively throughout the chamber.

The maturation of a pyrometric cone is determined by the integration of temperature, time (heat work), and atmospheric conditions, though temperature remains the primary variable. Because firing environments often deviate from the laboratory conditions used during initial calibration, results are expressed as an equivalent temperature.

Monitoring the deformation of these cones provides a visual confirmation that the kiln has achieved the desired state of maturation. Additionally, small cones or bars can be utilised to mechanically trigger kiln shut-off controls once the requisite thermal energy is reached.

Pyrometric cones can be used in a "kiln sitter", a device which senses the softening of a cone and produces a mechanical output through a trigger assembly, typically to switch off the kiln.

== Control of variability ==
Pyrometric cones are sensitive measuring devices and it is important to users that they should remain consistent in the way that they react to heating. Cone manufacturers follow procedures to control variability (within batches and between batches) to ensure that cones of a given grade remain consistent in their properties over long periods. A number of national standards and an ISO standard have been published regarding pyrometric cones.

Even though cones from different manufacturers can have relatively similar numbering systems, they are not identical in their characteristics. If a change is made from one manufacturer to another, then allowances for the differences can sometimes be necessary.

== History ==
In 1782, Josiah Wedgwood created accurately scaled pyrometric device, with details published in the Philosophical Transactions of the Royal Society of London in 1782 (Vol. LXXII, part 2). This led him to be elected a fellow of the Royal Society.

The modern form of the pyrometric cone was developed by Hermann Seger and first used to control the firing of porcelain wares at the Royal Porcelain Factory, Berlin (Königliche Porzellanmanufaktur, in 1886, where Seger was director. Seger cones are made by a small number of companies and the term is often used as a synonym for pyrometric cones. The Standard Pyrometric Cone Company was founded in Columbus, Ohio, by Edward J. Orton, Jr. in 1896 to manufacture pyrometric cones, and following his death a charitable trust established to operate the company, which is known Edward Orton Jr. Ceramic Foundation, or Orton Ceramic Foundation.

Pyrometric cones are often referred to as Orton Cones within the United States, but in his lifetime Orton preferred calling them Seger cones.

I hope no one will ever apply my name to the cone system in any way, because Dr. Seger deserves all the glory which there is in having brought us this most convenient system. My cones are labeled Standard pyrometric cones. I have hesitated to print the term Seger cones on my output because the German cone makers...might feel I was attempting to cut under or defraud them...The name Seger cone will then become a sort of monument to that prominent man, who must always be recognized as the first scientific ceramist of all history.

— Edward Orton Jr., "Remarks on Seger Cones", Clay Record (November 15, 1900)

== Ceramic art ==
A biennial ceramic art exhibition for small work, the Orton Cone Box Show, took the Orton Cone company's pyrometric cone box as the size constraint for submissions.

== Temperature ranges ==
The following temperature equivalents for pyrometric cones were retrieved from references in the External Links section.

	Orton											Börkey Keratech				Nimra Glass	Min	Max
	Self-Supporting Cones						Large Cones				Small							
	Regular — SSB			Iron Free — SSK			Regular — LRB		Iron Free — IFB		Regular							
Heating Rate:	15°C/hr	60°C/hr	150°C/hr	15°C/hr	60°C/hr	150°C/hr	60°C/hr	150°C/hr	60°C/hr	150°C/hr	300°C/hr	150°C/hr	150°C/hr	20°C/hr	20°C/hr			
Type:	Slow	Medium	Fast	Slow	Medium	Fast	Medium	Fast	Medium	Fast	Fast	Normal	Laboratory	Normal	Laboratory			
Cone #																		
022		586°C	590°C								630°C	595°C	605°C	580°C	585°C	590°C	580°C	630°C
021		600°C	617°C								643°C	640°C	650°C	620°C	625°C	610°C	600°C	650°C
020		626°C	638°C								666°C	660°C	675°C	635°C	640°C	635°C	626°C	675°C
019	656°C	678°C	695°C				676°C	693°C			723°C	685°C	695°C	655°C	665°C	685°C	655°C	723°C
018	686°C	715°C	734°C				712°C	732°C			752°C	705°C	715°C	675°C	680°C	725°C	675°C	752°C
017	705°C	738°C	763°C				736°C	761°C			784°C	730°C	735°C	695°C	695°C	750°C	695°C	784°C
016	742°C	772°C	796°C				769°C	794°C			825°C	755°C	760°C	720°C	720°C	786°C	720°C	825°C
015a												780°C	785°C	740°C	750°C		740°C	785°C
015	750°C	791°C	818°C				788°C	816°C			843°C					810°C	750°C	843°C
014a												805°C	815°C	780°C	790°C		780°C	815°C
014	757°C	807°C	838°C				807°C	836°C			870°C					830°C	757°C	870°C
013a												835°C	845°C	840°C	860°C		835°C	860°C
013	807°C	837°C	861°C				837°C	859°C			880°C					860°C	807°C	880°C
012a												860°C	890°C	860°C	880°C		860°C	890°C
012	843°C	861°C	882°C				858°C	880°C			900°C					865°C	843°C	900°C
011a												900°C	900°C	880°C	890°C		880°C	900°C
011	857°C	875°C	894°C				873°C	892°C			915°C					885°C	857°C	915°C
010a												920°C	925°C	900°C	910°C		900°C	925°C
010	891°C	903°C	915°C	871°C	886°C	893°C	898°C	913°C	884°C	891°C	919°C					895°C	871°C	919°C
09a												935°C	940°C	920°C	930°C		920°C	940°C
09	907°C	920°C	930°C	899°C	919°C	928°C	917°C	928°C	917°C	926°C	955°C					925°C	899°C	955°C
08a												955°C	965°C	930°C	940°C		930°C	965°C
08	922°C	942°C	956°C	924°C	946°C	957°C	942°C	954°C	945°C	955°C	983°C					955°C	922°C	983°C
07a												970°C	975°C	950°C	955°C		950°C	975°C
07	962°C	976°C	987°C	953°C	971°C	982°C	973°C	985°C	970°C	980°C	1008°C					980°C	953°C	1008°C
06a												990°C	995°C	970°C	980°C		970°C	995°C
06	981°C	998°C	1013°C	969°C	991°C	998°C	995°C	1011°C	991°C	996°C	1023°C					1000°C	969°C	1023°C
05½	1004°C	1015°C	1025°C	990°C	1012°C	1021°C	1012°C	1023°C	1011°C	1020°C	1043°C						990°C	1043°C
05a												1000°C	1010°C	990°C	1010°C		990°C	1010°C
05	1021°C	1031°C	1044°C	1013°C	1037°C	1046°C	1030°C	1046°C	1032°C	1044°C	1062°C					1045°C	1013°C	1062°C
04a												1025°C	1055°C	1015°C	1035°C		1015°C	1055°C
04	1046°C	1063°C	1077°C	1043°C	1061°C	1069°C	1060°C	1070°C	1060°C	1067°C	1098°C					1060°C	1043°C	1098°C
03a												1055°C	1070°C	1040°C	1055°C		1040°C	1070°C
03	1071°C	1086°C	1104°C	1066°C	1088°C	1093°C	1086°C	1101°C	1087°C	1091°C	1131°C					1100°C	1066°C	1131°C
02a												1085°C	1100°C	1070°C	1090°C		1070°C	1100°C
02	1078°C	1102°C	1122°C	1084°C	1105°C	1115°C	1101°C	1120°C	1102°C	1113°C	1148°C					1120°C	1078°C	1148°C
01a												1105°C	1125°C	1090°C	1105°C		1090°C	1125°C
01	1093°C	1119°C	1138°C	1101°C	1123°C	1134°C	1117°C	1137°C	1122°C	1132°C	1178°C					1138°C	1093°C	1178°C
1	1109°C	1137°C	1154°C	1119°C	1139°C	1148°C	1136°C	1154°C	1137°C	1146°C	1184°C					1155°C	1109°C	1184°C
1a												1125°C	1145°C	1105°C	1120°C		1105°C	1145°C
2	1112°C	1142°C	1164°C				1142°C	1162°C			1190°C					1160°C	1112°C	1190°C
2a												1150°C	1165°C	1125°C	1135°C		1125°C	1165°C
3	1115°C	1152°C	1170°C	1130°C	1154°C	1162°C	1152°C	1168°C	1151°C	1160°C	1196°C					1170°C	1115°C	1196°C
3a												1170°C	1185°C	1140°C	1150°C		1140°C	1185°C
4	1141°C	1162°C	1183°C				1160°C	1181°C			1209°C					1185°C	1141°C	1209°C
4a												1195°C	1220°C	1160°C	1170°C		1160°C	1220°C
5	1159°C	1186°C	1207°C				1184°C	1205°C			1221°C					1200°C	1159°C	1221°C
5½	1167°C	1203°C	1225°C														1167°C	1225°C
5a												1215°C	1230°C	1175°C	1185°C		1175°C	1230°C
6	1185°C	1222°C	1243°C				1220°C	1241°C			1255°C					1225°C	1185°C	1255°C
6a												1240°C	1260°C	1195°C	1210°C		1195°C	1260°C
7	1201°C	1239°C	1257°C				1237°C	1255°C			1264°C	1260°C	1270°C	1215°C	1230°C	1240°C	1201°C	1270°C
8	1211°C	1249°C	1271°C				1247°C	1269°C			1300°C	1280°C	1295°C	1240°C	1255°C	1260°C	1211°C	1300°C
9	1224°C	1260°C	1280°C				1257°C	1278°C			1317°C	1300°C	1315°C	1255°C	1270°C	1280°C	1224°C	1317°C
10	1251°C	1285°C	1305°C				1282°C	1303°C			1330°C	1320°C	1330°C	1280°C	1290°C	1300°C	1251°C	1330°C
11	1272°C	1294°C	1315°C				1293°C	1312°C			1336°C	1340°C	1350°C	1300°C	1315°C	1315°C	1272°C	1350°C
12	1285°C	1306°C	1326°C				1304°C	1324°C			1355°C	1360°C	1375°C	1330°C	1340°C	1330°C	1285°C	1375°C
13	1310°C	1331°C	1348°C				1321°C	1346°C				1380°C	1395°C	1360°C	1375°C	1345°C	1310°C	1395°C
14	1351°C	1365°C	1384°C				1388°C	1366°C				1400°C	1410°C	1370°C	1395°C	1365°C	1351°C	1410°C
15												1425°C	1440°C	1400°C	1420°C	1430°C	1400°C	1440°C
16												1445°C	1470°C	1425°C	1445°C	1475°C	1425°C	1475°C
17												1480°C	1500°C	1445°C	1465°C	1485°C	1445°C	1500°C
18												1500°C	1520°C	1470°C	1480°C	1505°C	1470°C	1520°C
19												1515°C	1540°C	1495°C	1505°C	1530°C	1495°C	1540°C
20												1530°C	1560°C	1515°C	1530°C	1550°C	1515°C	1560°C
21																1570°C	1570°C	1570°C
23												1540°C	---	---	---	1591°C	1540°C	1591°C
26												1560°C	1580°C	---	---	1607°C	1560°C	1607°C
27												1595°C	1600°C	---	---		1595°C	1600°C
27½												---	1620°C	---	---		1620°C	1620°C
28												1605°C	1640°C	---	---		1605°C	1640°C
29												1635°C	1660°C	---	---		1635°C	1660°C
30												1655°C	1680°C	---	---		1655°C	1680°C
31												1680°C	1700°C	---	---		1680°C	1700°C
32												1695°C	1710°C	---	---		1695°C	1710°C
32½												---	1720°C	---	---		1720°C	1720°C
33												1710°C	1730°C	---	---		1710°C	1730°C
33½												---	1740°C	---	---		1740°C	1740°C
34												1725°C	1760°C	---	---		1725°C	1760°C
35												1765°C	1780°C	---	---		1765°C	1780°C
36												1790°C	1800°C	---	---		1790°C	1800°C
37												1815°C	1830°C	---	---		1815°C	1830°C
38												1840°C	1860°C	---	---		1840°C	1860°C
39												1860°C	1880°C	---	---		1860°C	1880°C
40												1880°C	1900°C	---	---		1880°C	1900°C
41												1915°C	1940°C	---	---		1915°C	1940°C
42												1955°C	1980°C	---	---		1955°C	1980°C
