= Nina Hole =

Danish artist

- Born: 20 February 1941; Denmark
- Died: 21 February 2016 (aged 75); Ørslev, Denmark
- Known for: Artist; Sculptor
- Website: ninahole.com

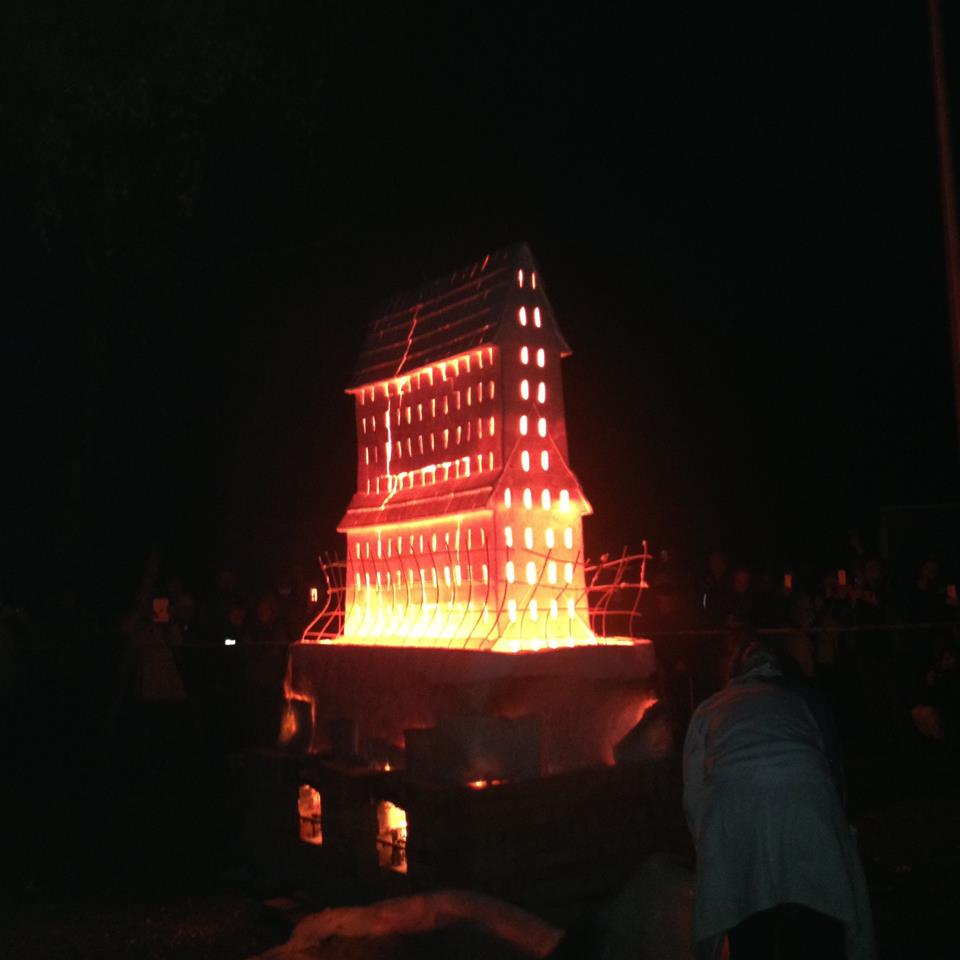
Nina Hole Firing Sculpture, Guldagergaard 2015.

Nina Hole (20 February 1941 – 21 February 2016) was a Danish artist, sculptor, and performance artist who helped to found the CLAY Museum of Ceramic Art Denmark and the International Ceramics Center–Guldagergaard.

== Biography ==
Hole studied at the Art and Craft School, Copenhagen, and Fredonia State College, New York. She was a founding member of Clay Today, a cooperative which organized an international symposium at the Tommerup Brickyard Studio in Funen, Denmark, in 1990. Hole was a primary force behind the establishment of the CLAY Museum of Ceramic Art, Denmark, which opened in Middelfart in 1994, where she also served for a time on the museum board. In 1997, Hole's energy and intelligence helped to create the International Ceramics Research Center – Guldagergaard, in Skælskør, Denmark.

Known for her fiery enthusiasm for clay, creation, and community, Hole first gained recognition for a series of enormous burning works that she called "Fire Sculptures." Hole wrote of these works, which synthesized aspects of ceramics and performance: "I have developed a concept of constructing large outdoor sculptures that include all the elements: the burning, the structural surface, the form, controlling the fire, and change."

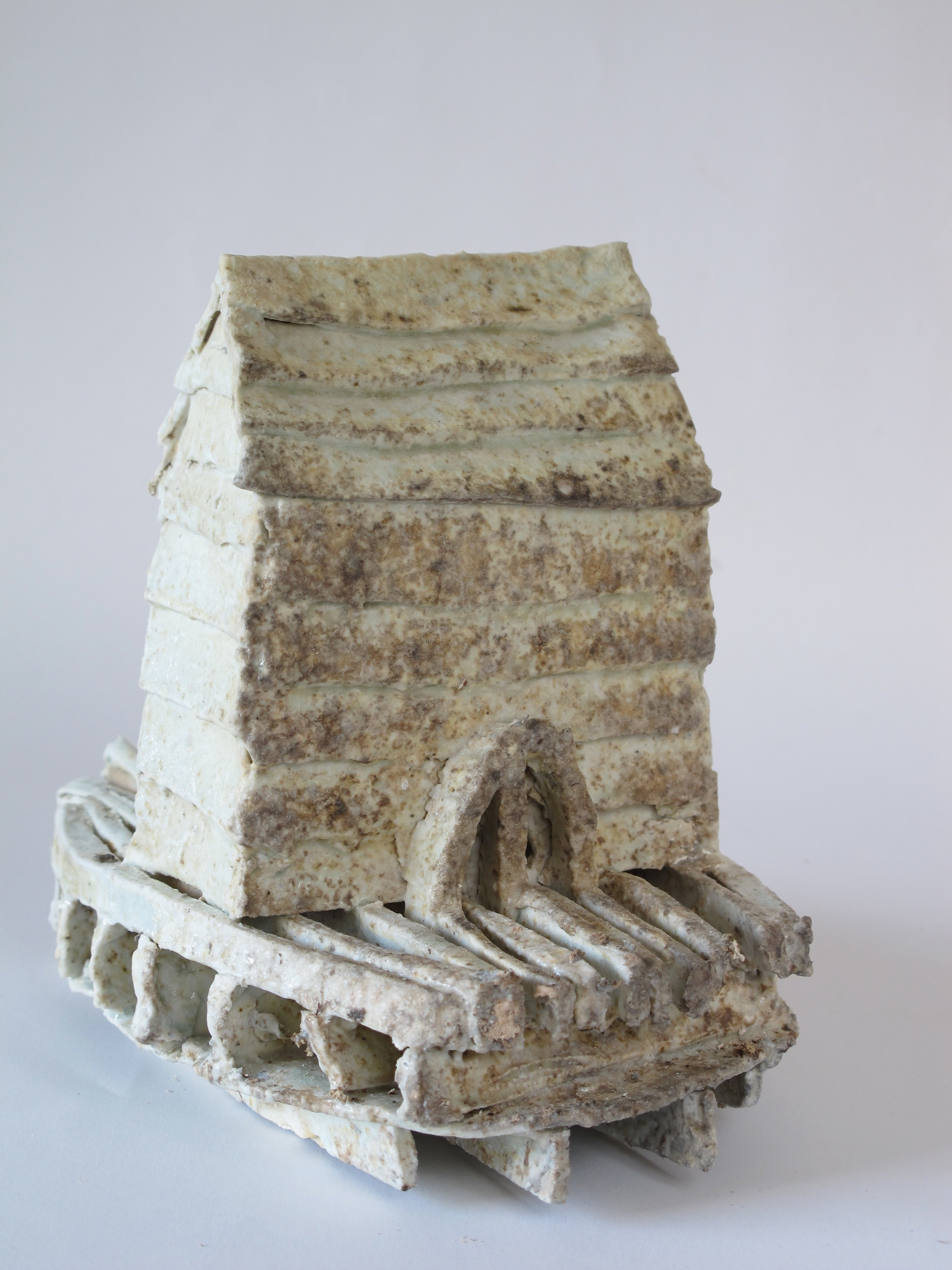
Small House Sculpture by Nina Hole

From the outset of her training, Hole felt that ceramics pedagogy in Denmark was too rigid. She bridled against rules dictating acceptable notions of form and surface. Hole's desire to push her work beyond convention made her open to experiencing new cultures. She came to the United States in the 1970s and found a sense of connection with the open-mindedness of the American ceramics scene of that era, wherein experimentation with material, process, and form was encouraged. The decade she spent in the U.S. led Hole to recognize more vividly the deeply embedded roles of memory, native culture, and terrain in her artistic ambition. Particularly embedded for her was the interrelationship in Denmark of the tower structures of old churches with the natural landscape. Explorations of tensions and harmony between nature and the built environment remained central to the evolution of imagery in many of her Fire Sculptures.

Hole often worked with the help of community members and workshop volunteers. She integrated kiln and sculpture into a single structure incorporating a firebox beneath the work. Hole's first Fire Sculpture, The House of the Rising Sun, was built on Janet Mansfield's farm in Gulgong, Australia, in 1994. Hole's initial collaboration in Fire Sculpture research occurred with a fellow artist, Jørgen Hansen. Another important collaboration included her work with the American artist and kiln designer Fred Olsen. Hole's technical breakthroughs grew out of experimentation with construction techniques and materials. This included use of insulating fibre blankets that became accessible to artists following research into the design of high-tech furnaces and the needs of the space industry. Like the California artist John Roloff, who began to create site-specific fired-earth works in the mid-1980s, Hole used fiber blankets to integrate the firing process in the creation of new works. Hole used fiber to envelop large ceramic sculptures constructed in the landscape using a system of baffle-like structures throughout her monolithic forms.

Hole died in early 2016, and the International Ceramics Center–Guldagergaard has created the Nina Hole Memorial Residency Award in her honor.

== Performance firings ==
- Fire Sculpture in Skælskør
- Fire Sculpture in Höhr-Grenzhausen

== Awards ==
- The Ceramist of the Year, Vest Sjaelland, Denmark (1991)
- Chautauqua Art Show, New York, United States (1973–1974)
- Westwood Raku Show, California, United States (1970)

== Grants and scholarships ==
- The Danish Institute Athens with the Velux Foundation
- The Danish State Art Fund, 3 years support, 1996
- Knud Højgaards Fond
- The Danish State Art Fund
- Hrs. Cl. Davids Legat for slægt og venner
- Denmark National Bank's Jubilæumsfond
- Fl. Smidt & Co. A/s gavefond
- Politiken-Fonden
- Unibank Fund
- Ole Haslunds Art Fund
- Anna Klint Sørensens Fund

== Art juries ==
- 2000 Orton Cone Box Show juror with Jeff Oestreich and Richard Notkin
