= Gretchen Ritter =

American academic administrator

Vice Chancellor & Provost of Syracuse University
- In office October 1, 2021 – June 30, 2024
- Preceded by: John Liu
- Succeeded by: Lois Agnew (interim)

Dean & Vice Provost of Ohio State University College of Arts and Sciences
- In office August 1, 2019 – August 31, 2021
- Preceded by: Janet M. Box-Steffensmeier
- Succeeded by: David G. Horn

Dean of Cornell University College of Arts and Sciences
- In office August 1, 2013 – August 31, 2018
- Preceded by: Peter Lepage
- Succeeded by: Ray Jayawardhana

Vice provost of University of Texas at Austin
- In office 2009 – July 31, 2013

Personal details
- Born: 27 December 1960 (age 65) Arlington County, Virginia, U.S.
- Education: Cornell University (BS); Massachusetts Institute of Technology (PhD)

Gretchen Ritter is an American political scientist and academic administrator who currently serves as the executive vice president and provost at the University of Minnesota. She was previously a vice chancellor, provost, and vice president at Syracuse University, executive dean and vice provost of Ohio State University's College of Arts and Sciences, and the Harold Tanner Dean of Arts and Sciences at Cornell University.

== Early life and education ==
Ritter was born in Arlington County, Virginia, and raised in Upstate New York. She has four siblings. After high school, she received her bachelor's degree with distinction from Cornell University and her Ph.D. in political science from the Massachusetts Institute of Technology.

== Career ==
Ritter is a leading expert in the history of women's constitutional rights and contemporary issues concerning democracy and citizenship in American politics. She has taught at MIT, Princeton University, Harvard University, and the University of Texas at Austin.

From 2009 to 2013, she was the vice provost for undergraduate education and faculty governance at the University of Texas at Austin, where she created the Course Transformation Program, promoting increased levels of student success in gateway courses through redesign efforts that incorporated active learning and educational technologies.

In 2013, she became the first woman to serve as the Harold Tanner Dean of the College of Arts and Sciences at Cornell University, a position she held until 2018. While in office, she spearheaded and piloted the creation of a new one-credit advising seminar for first year students. She also supported the creation of the Cornell Neurotech Program, a joint initiative between the College of Arts and Sciences and College of Engineering, the goal being to develop technologies and tools to reveal the interactions between brain cells and complex neural circuits at the speed of thought. And, she secured philanthropic support to launch the Milstein Program from Technology and Humanity jointly with the Cornell Tech Campus.

From 2019 to 2021, she served as the executive dean and vice provost of Ohio State University's College of Arts and Sciences. Here, she helped to develop and secure support for implementation of the university's new general education requirements. Ritter led the development of the Race, Inclusion and Social Equity (RAISE) initiative at Ohio State University to promote research to address racial and social disparities.

Ritter left her position at Ohio State in August 2021 and became the vice chancellor, provost, and chief academic officer of Syracuse University in October 2021. There she oversaw the effort to create a new academic strategic plan, "Leading with Distinction", that identifies five areas of distinctive excellence for future growth: emerging technologies, human thriving, global diversity, experiential inquiry, and engaged citizenship. She also co-chaired the working group that developed the Syracuse Statement on Free Expression and Free Inquiry, outlining the University’s commitment to ensuring free speech and academic freedom among faculty and students, one of many instances Ritter has emphasized the importance of such throughout her professional career. In 2024, Ritter became the Vice President for Civic Engagement and Education at Syracuse. In this role, she worked with colleagues to launch the "Life Together: Seeking the Common Good in a Diverse Democracy," initiative, which promotes civil discourse and the civic engagement on the Syracuse University campus.

Ritter left Syracuse in July 2025 to become the University of Minnesota's executive vice president and provost.

Ritter is the author of two books, The Constitution as Social Design: Gender and Civic Membership in the American Constitutional Order and Goldbugs and Greenbacks: The Antimonology Tradition and the Politics of Finance in America, 1865–1896. She is a co-editor of Democratization in America: A Comparative and Historical Perspective.

Ritter is the recipient of several fellowships and awards, including the National Endowment for Humanities Fellowship, the Radcliffe Research Partnership Award, and a Liberal Arts Fellowship at Harvard Law School. She is also a member of the American Political Science Association and the Council on Foreign Relations.

A skilled interviewer, Ritter interviewed Justice Ruth Bader Ginsburg at the New-York Historical Society. Other notable interview subjects over the years have included the political philosopher Michael Rogin, Vice President JD Vance, artists Michael Mercil and Ann Hamilton, Congresswoman Liz Cheney, opinion writers John McWhorter and Michael Eric Dyson, and creative writer George Saunders.

== Works ==
- Ritter, Gretchen (1997). Goldbugs and Greenbacks: The Antimonopoly Tradition and the Politics of Finance in America, 1865–1896. Cambridge, U.K.: Cambridge University Press. ISBN 9780521653923. OCLC 181692643.
- Ritter, Gretchen (2006). The Constitution as Social Design: Gender and Civic Membership in the American Constitutional Order. Stanford, California: Stanford University Press. ISBN 9780804754385. OCLC 654816215.
