= Natividad Ruiz =

American microbiologist

- Education: University of Kansas; Washington University in St. Louis
- Scientific career
- Fields: Microbiology
- Workplaces: Ohio State University
- Doctoral advisor: Michael G. Caparon
- Other academic advisors: John C. Brown; Thomas J. Silhavy

Natividad Ruiz is an American microbiologist who is a professor at the Ohio State University College of Arts and Sciences.

== Life ==
Ruiz earned a B.A. in microbiology and chemistry from the University of Kansas in 1993. She was an undergraduate researcher under advisor John C. Brown. She received a Ph.D. in molecular microbiology and microbial pathogenesis from the Washington University in St. Louis in 1998. Michael G. Caparon was her doctoral advisor. At Princeton University, Ruiz was a postdoctoral researcher from 1998 to 2006 with Thomas J. Silhavy and a research scientist from 2006 to 2010.

In 2010, Ruiz joined the department of microbiology at the Ohio State University College of Arts and Sciences as an assistant professor. She was promoted to associate professor in 2015 and professor in 2019. Ruiz was elected a fellow of the American Society for Microbiology and the American Association for the Advancement of Science in 2021 and 2023 respectively.
