= Jacob Snyder =

American architect

- Born: March 12, 1823; Columbia County, Pennsylvania
- Died: December 29, 1890 (aged 67); Akron, Ohio
- Occupation: Architect

Jacob Snyder (March 12, 1823 – December 29, 1890) American architect best known as a designer of churches as well as one of the inventors of the Akron Plan.

== Early years ==
Born in Columbia County, Pennsylvania, Snyder learned the basics of the building trade from his father who was a contractor and builder. Attending Dickenson College in Carlisle he studied one year of architecture. In 1853 he moved to Akron, Ohio where within two years he began designing and building houses. In the years following the Civil War besides designing numerous residences he also began to specialize in church designing, eventually building churches in many communities, primarily in Ohio.

Snyder designed University Hall, the first permanent building for the Ohio State University.
