= University, Hayes and Orton Halls =

United States historic places in Columbus, Ohio, USA

- U.S. National Register of Historic Places
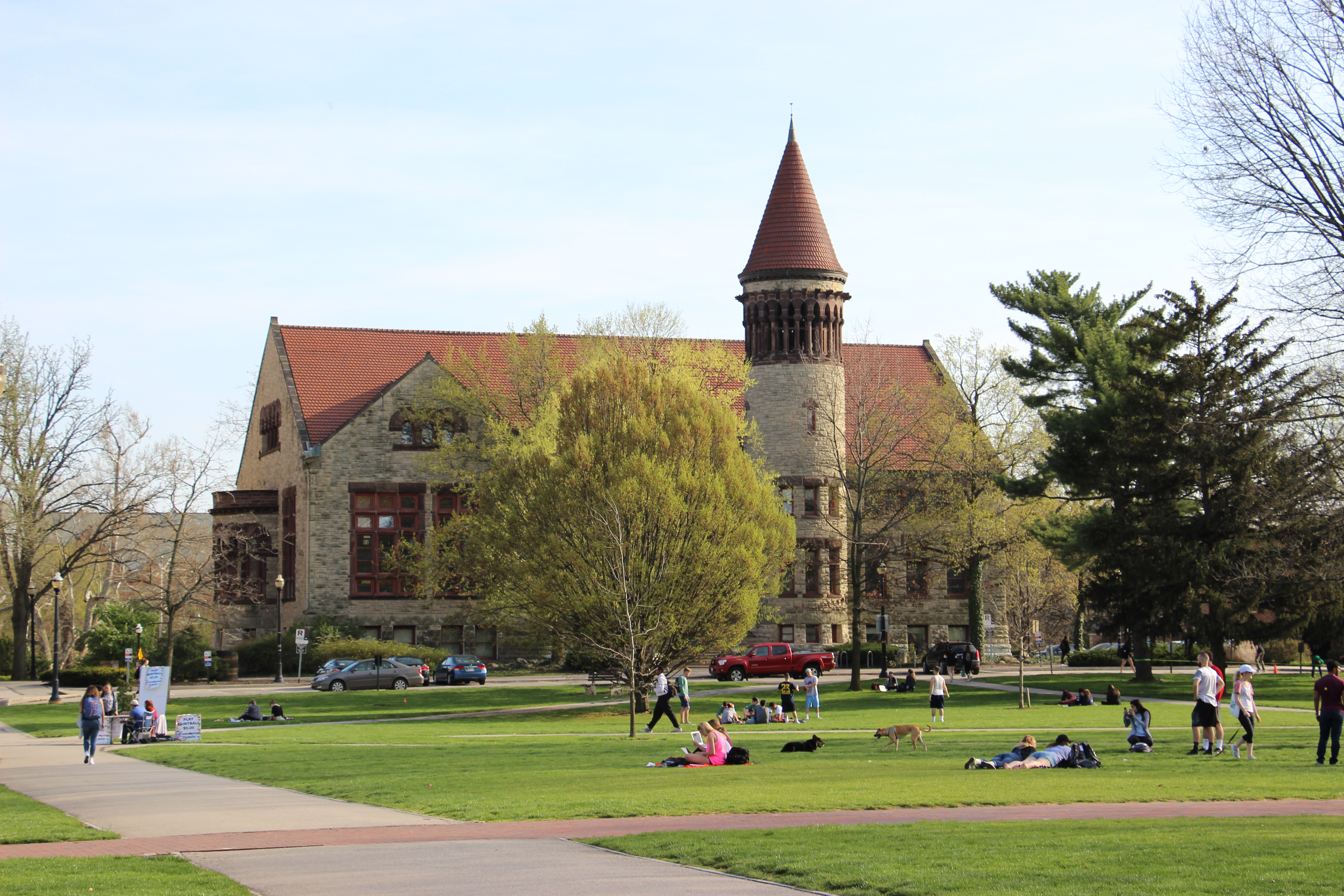
- Orton Hall
- Interactive map of the buildings
- Location: Columbus, Ohio
- Coordinates: 40°0′4.78″N 83°0′52.43″W
- Built: 1893
- Architect: Yost & Packard
- Architectural style: Romanesque
- NRHP reference No.: 70000492
- Added to NRHP: July 16, 1970

University, Hayes and Orton Halls are three historic buildings on the Oval at the Ohio State University in Columbus, Ohio, US. On July 16, 1970, they were added to the National Register of Historic Places. The original University Hall was demolished in 1971, and removed from the National Register that year.

== University Hall ==
The original University Hall was constructed in 1873, and contained a majority of the university functions, including both student and faculty housing. It was the first structure used for educational purposes at the school. After being closed in 1968 for safety reasons, the building was completely torn down in 1971. At this time the old hall was removed from the National Register of Historic Places. The current University Hall was reconstructed in its place, taking a similar exterior appearance to the original building, but updating the inner workings. Notable exterior differences include elimination of the east and west entrances and chimneys and alteration of the clocktower by relocating the clock and removing the roof's gables. The new building was completed in 1976.

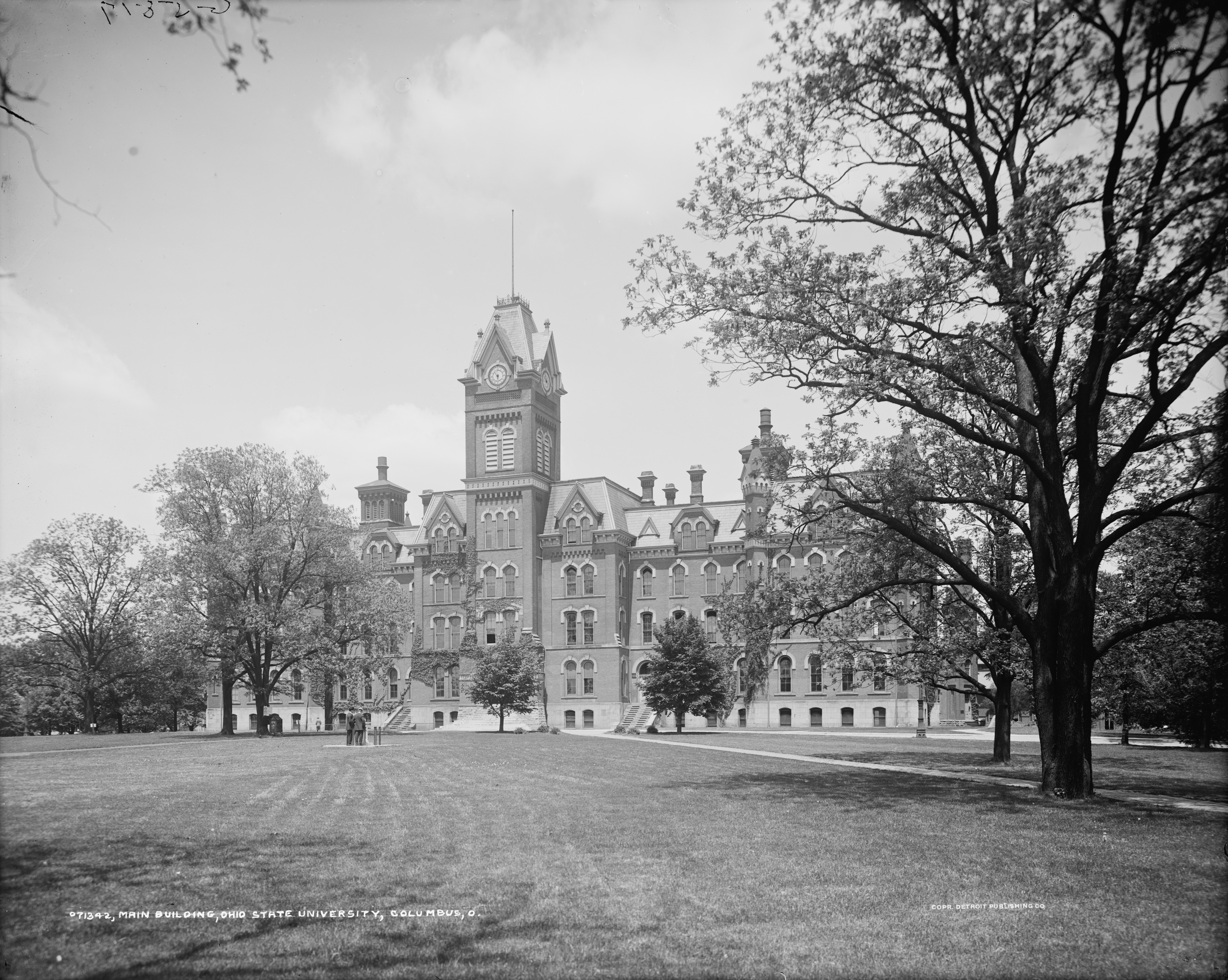
The original University Hall, c. 1900–1910

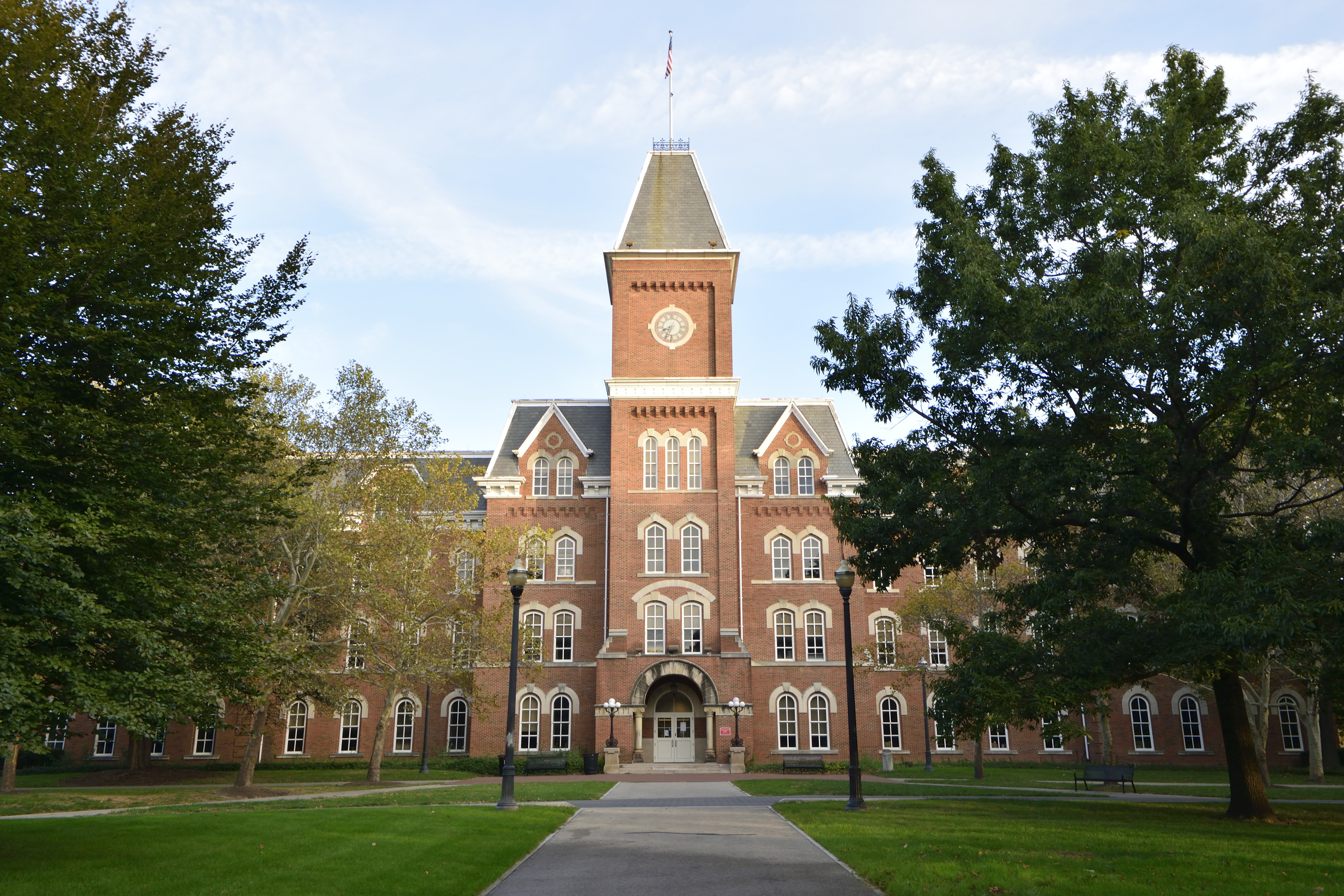
Current University Hall

== Hayes Hall ==
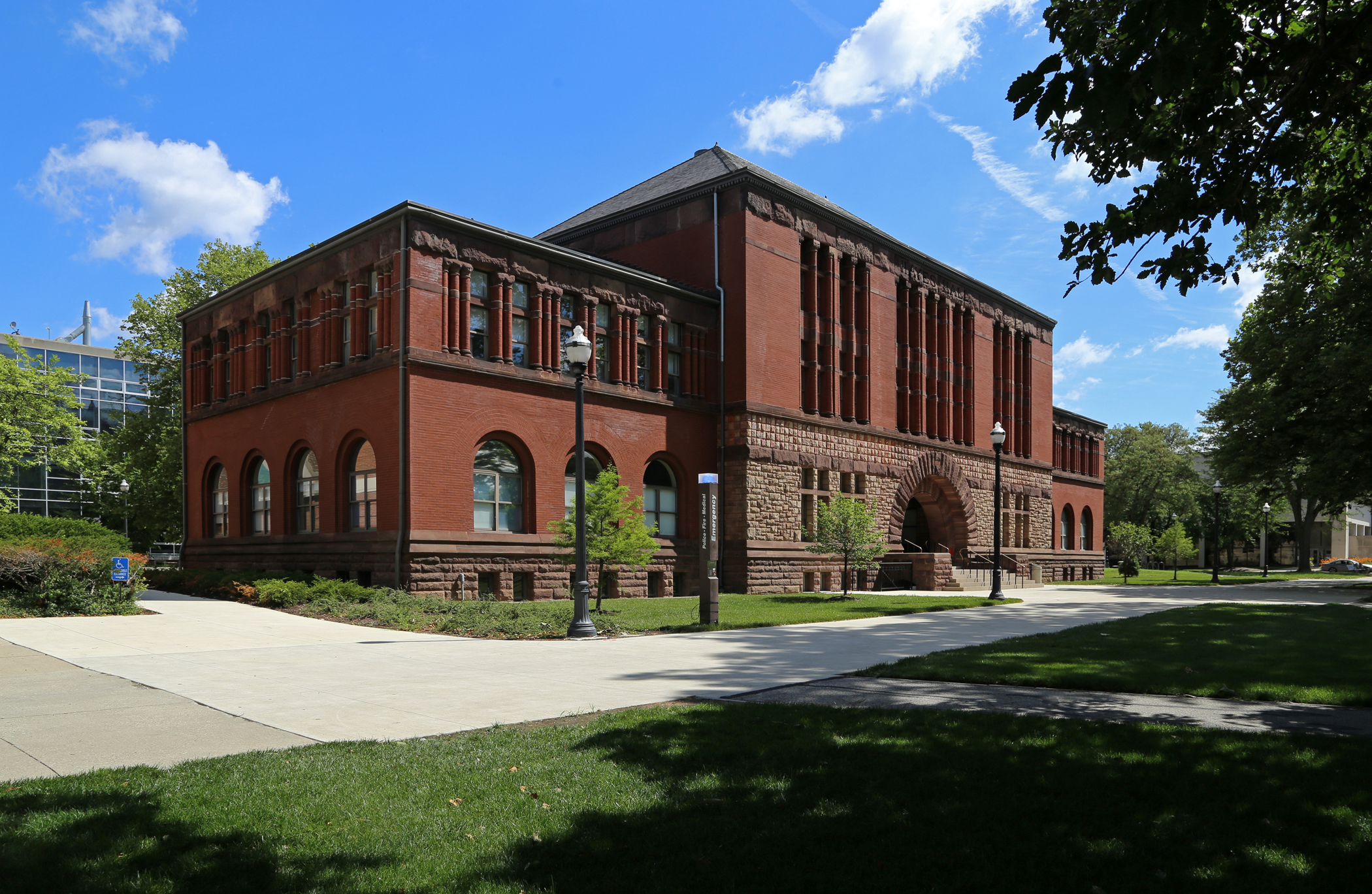
Hayes Hall

Hayes Hall was built in 1893 and is the oldest existing building on campus. The building is named after Rutherford B. Hayes, 19th President of the United States and three-time governor of Ohio, who advocated for a newly established land-grant university in Ohio. Hayes Hall is currently occupied by the Department of Design, part of The Ohio State University College of Arts and Sciences as of 2024. Hayes Hall was placed on the National Register of Historic Places on July 16, 1970 due to the fact that its front façade remains virtually untouched from its original appearance.

== Orton Hall ==
Orton Hall, one of the oldest remaining buildings on Ohio State University campus, opened in 1893 and is named after Edward Orton, Sr. who served as OSU's first president, Professor of Geology from 1873 to 1899, and Ohio's State Geologist from 1882 until his death in 1899. Orton Hall is a tribute to this man's dedicated service towards the understanding of the geology of Ohio.

Orton suffered a partially paralyzing stroke in 1891, but continued to work. Ohio State University constructed a geological pleasure dome in 1893, and named it Orton Hall, in tribute to Edward Orton's seminal contributions.

The Hall is built of forty different Ohio building stones. In the outside walls, these stones are laid in stratigraphic order according to their relative positions in Ohio's bedrock. The capitals of the numbered columns in the entrance hall feature carvings of fossils, such as trilobites, as well as other objects such as the races of Man. The bell tower was dedicated in 1915 and contains 25,000 pounds of bells that can be heard regularly tolling across campus in the key of E-flat. Encircling the top of the tower are 24 columns with gargoyle-like figures which are restorations of fossil animals.

Because of its unique architectural features, which have made it a campus landmark, Orton Hall has been entered into the National Register of Historic Places. It presently contains the School of Earth Science's offices and laboratories of Paleontology, Historical Geology and Sedimentology, the Orton Geological Museum, and the Orton Geological Library.

Orton Hall features a bell tower with 12 chimes that toll every 15 minutes to the tune of the Westminster Chimes. An instrumental depiction of the chimes features in an often heard arrangement of the school's alma mater, Carmen Ohio.

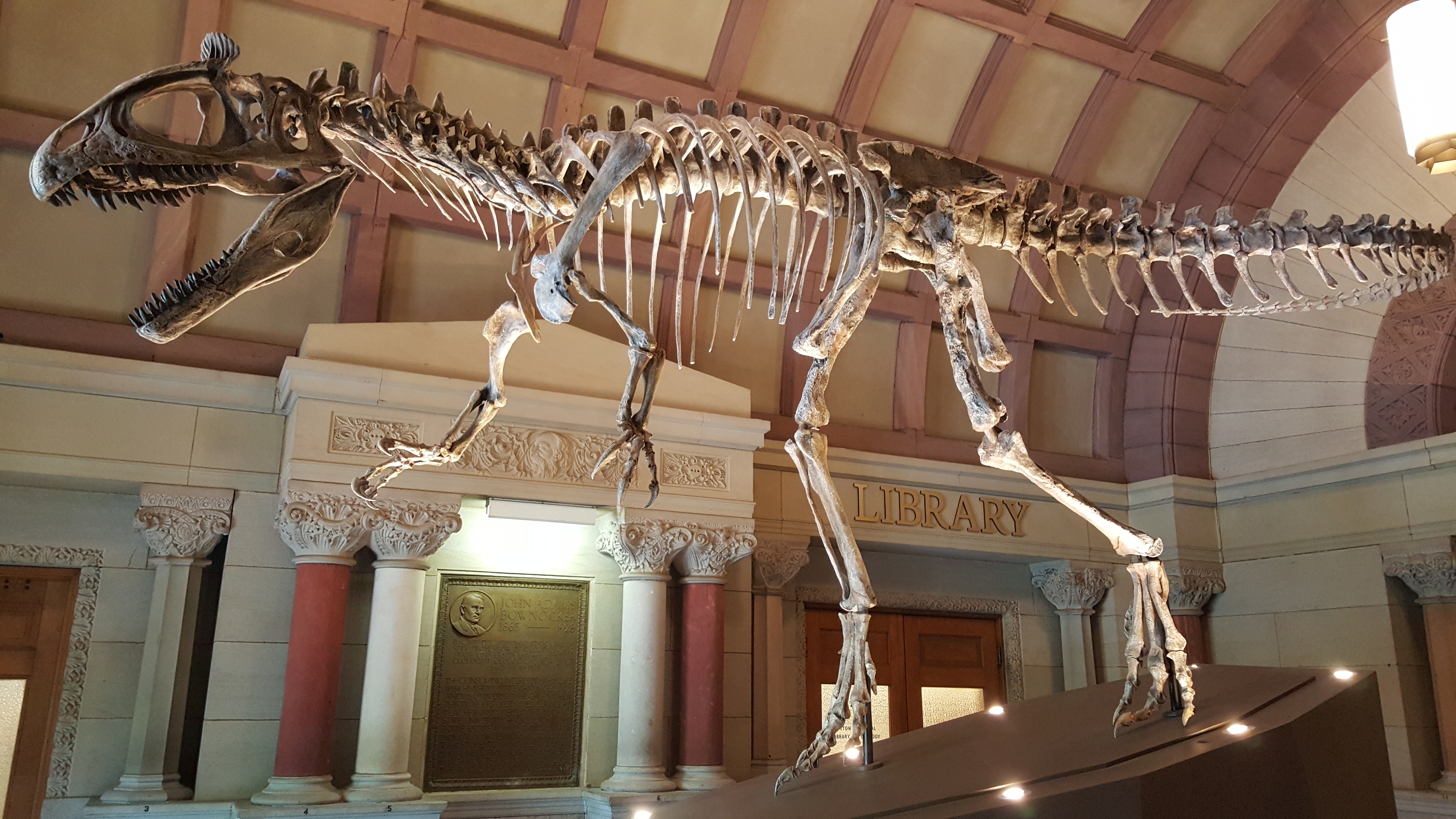
Cryolophosaurus ellioti at Orton Hall

In 2018, a 24-foot-long (7.3 m) replica of a Cryolophosaurus ellioti dinosaur was installed in the Orton Hall lobby. The replica was cast from a skeleton found in Antarctica by Ohio State University geologist David Elliot in 1991. The skeleton has been described as the most complete skeleton ever found on Antarctica. Cryolophosaurus ellioti was a predator that lived 190 million years ago during the Early Jurassic. A crowdfunding campaign raised $80,000 in order to pay for the replica and its installation.
