= Edward Orton Sr. =

United States geologist and educator (1829–1899)

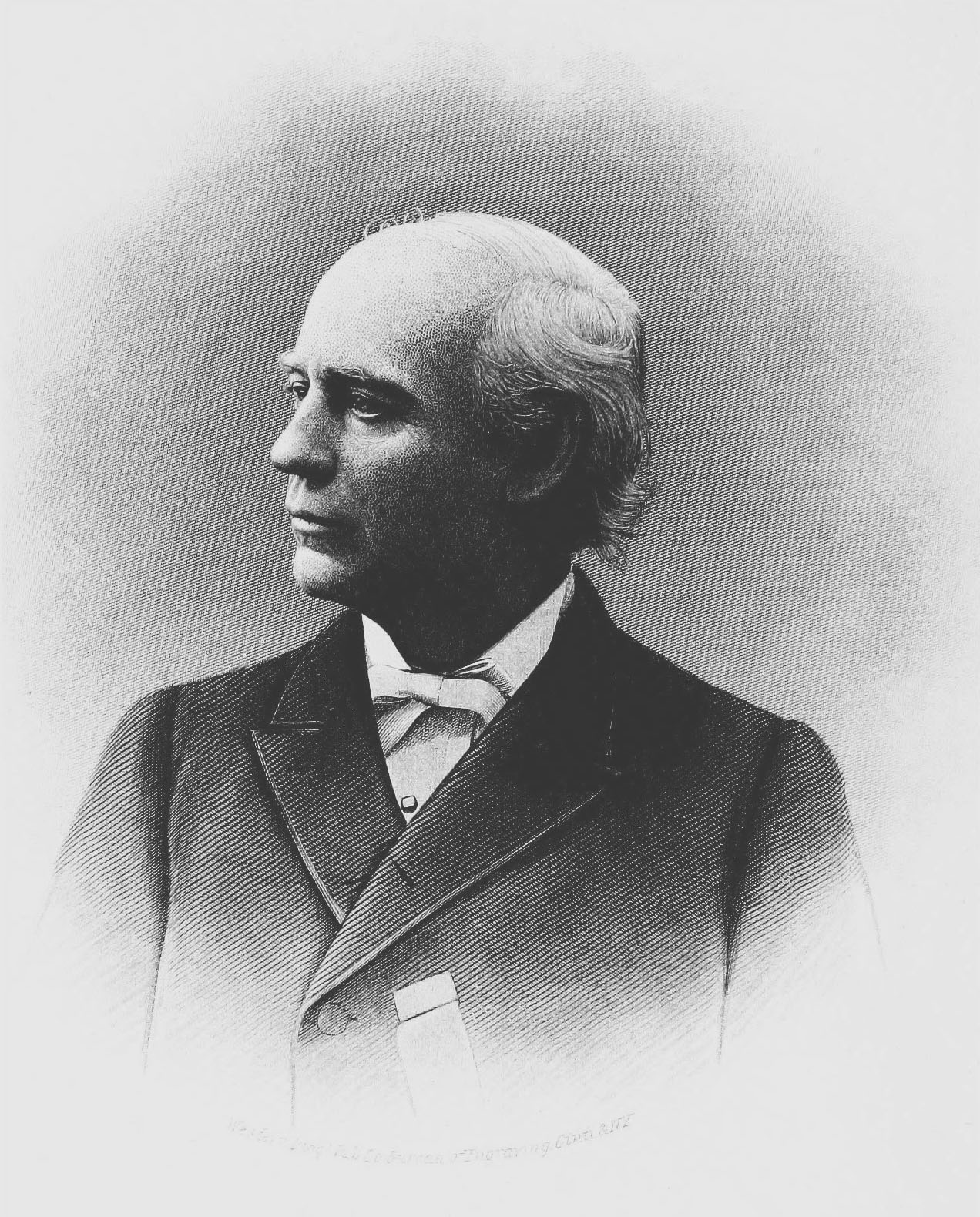
- Born: Edward Francis Baxter Orton; March 9, 1829; Deposit, New York, U.S.
- Died: October 16, 1899 (aged 70); Columbus, Ohio, U.S.
- Occupations: Academic administrator, professor, and geologist
- Title: State Geologist of Ohio
- Children: Edward Orton Jr.

Academic background
- Education: Hamilton College, 1848 Lane Theological Seminary Lawrence Scientific School at Harvard University Andover Theological Seminary

Academic work
- Institutions: Antioch College; Ohio Agricultural and Mechanical College

Edward Francis Baxter Orton (March 9, 1829 – October 16, 1899) was a United States geologist, minister, and the first president of Ohio State University. Orton founded Ohio State University's first academic department, the Department of Geology, and founded the Orton Geological Museum.

== Biography ==
Orton came from New York State, born in the town of Deposit in Delaware County and raised in the Lake Erie town of Ripley. He entered Hamilton College in 1845, graduating in 1848. He then spent time at Lane Theological Seminary (1849–50), Lawrence Scientific School at Harvard (1852–53), and then Andover Theological Seminary. During those times, he taught to earn income, but was interested in entering the ministry. He was ordained in 1856.

From 1856 to 1859, he was professor of natural science in the New York State Normal School at Albany. From 1859 to 1865, he was principal of the preparatory academy of Chester, New York. He became professor of natural history at Antioch College in 1865, and became its president in 1872. A year later, Orton became president of what was then the Ohio Agricultural and Mechanical College (now Ohio State University), where he also became professor of geology. He resigned the presidency in 1881, but continued as professor of geology until his death.

Orton was assistant state geologist of Ohio from 1869 to 1875. He was named state geologist in 1882, and continued in that position until his death in Columbus, Ohio, on October 16, 1899. He was a member of scientific societies and was president of the State Sanitary Association of Ohio in 1884–1885. He suffered a partially paralyzing stroke in 1891, but continued to work.

Orton served for a time on the geological surveys of the United States, of Kentucky, and of Kansas, and was president of the Geological Society of America (1896), and of the American Association for the Advancement of Science (1898–99). He was essentially an economic geologist and specialized in the study of oil and gas, developing several well-known theories, notably the anticlinal theory, becoming widely known as an authority on the nature and geological occurrence of these products.

Orton was elected to the American Philosophical Society in 1897.

Through his marriage to Anna Davenport Torrey, Orton was an uncle of U.S. President and Supreme Court Chief Justice William Howard Taft and a brother-in-law to Taft's father, U.S. Attorney General and Secretary of War Alphonso Taft.

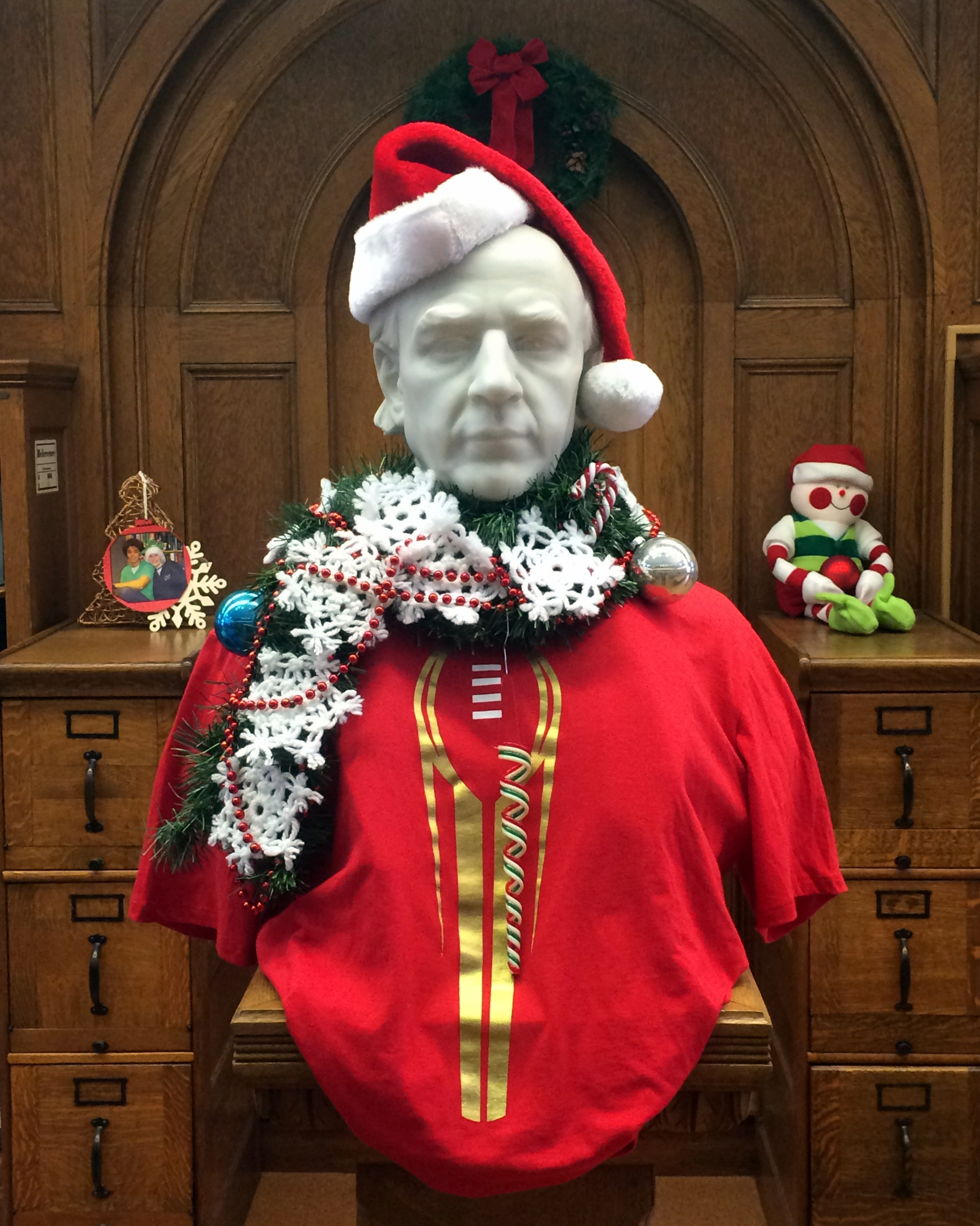
A bust of Edward Orton Sr. in the Orton Hall library at the Ohio State University, decorated to celebrate Christmas and the school football team's participation in the College Football Playoff

== Legacy ==
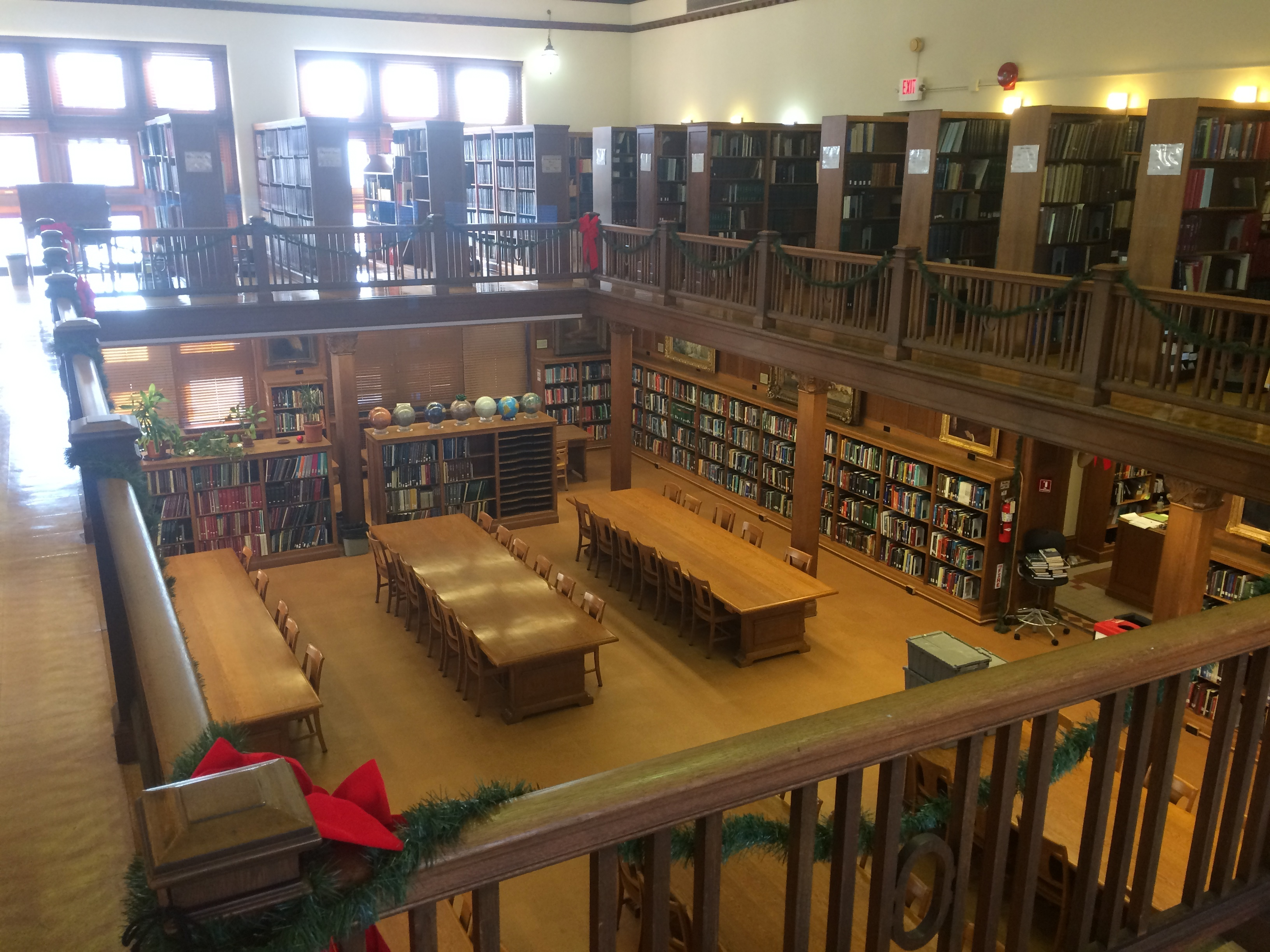
Orton Memorial Library of Geology

Ohio State University constructed a building to house the Orton Geology, the university library, and the Department of Geology in 1893, and named it Orton Hall, in tribute to Orton's seminal contributions to the university. In 1920, his son Edward Orton Jr., the first chairman of ceramic engineering at Ohio State University, honored his father with the Orton Memorial Library of Geology, inside Orton Hall, for perusing the theories and records of earthly change.

An Orton monument is located just outside of Clifton, Ohio, within the Clifton Gorge State Nature Preserve and the John Bryan State Park.

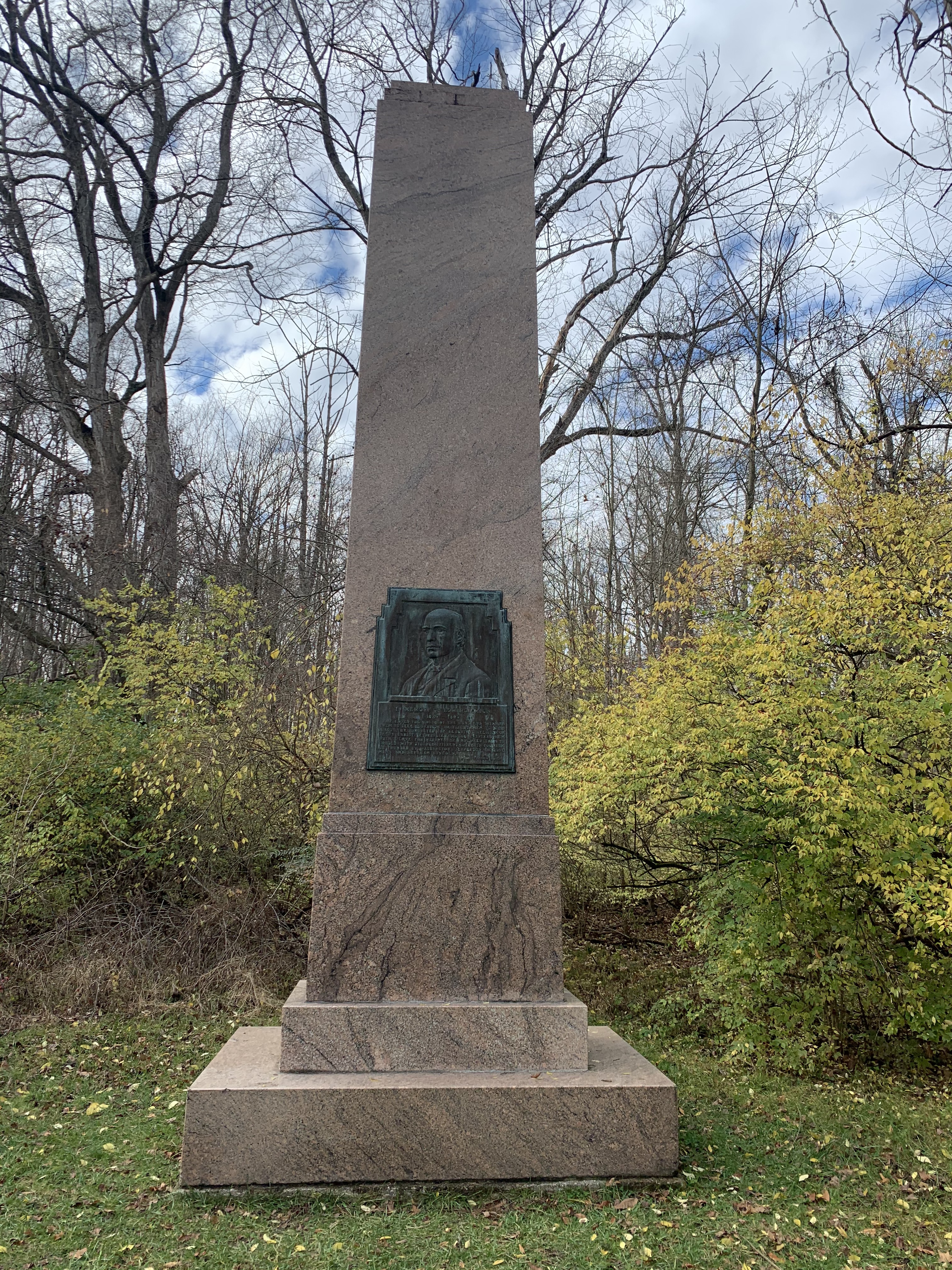
Edward Orton Monument - Clifton Gorge State Nature Preserve / John Bryan State Park

== Selected works ==
- Geology of Ohio, in part (Columbus, 1872-1875)
- Economic Geology of Ohio (2 vols., 1883-1888)
- Petroleum and Inflammable Gas (1887)
- Baynes, T. S.; Smith, W. R., eds. (1884). "Ohio" . Encyclopædia Britannica. Vol. 17 (9th ed.). New York: Charles Scribner's Sons. With OSU professor of history John Thomas Short.

== Notes ==
Academic offices
| New institution | Ohio State University President; September 17, 1873 – June 6, 1881 | Succeeded by Walter Quincy Scott |
