= Orton Cone Box Show =

The Orton Cone Box Show was a biennial ceramic art exhibition for small work that started in Indiana, United States and is now held in Kansas, United States. It was open to submissions from across the world.

The show's title was taken from the constraint on submissions, which must fit within the box in which Orton's pyrometric cones are shipped, 3" x 3" x 6" (approx. 75 mm x 75 mm x 150 mm.)

Submissions were adjudicated by up to four members of the ceramics art community in the United States, and exhibited during following year's the conference of the US National Council on Education for the Ceramic Arts.

== Dates & locations ==
1975, Purdue University
1977, University of Kansas
1979, University of Kansas
1994, Baker University
1996, Baker University
1998, Baker University
2000, Baker University
2002, Baker University
2004, Baker University
2006, Baker University
2008, Baker University
2010, Lawrence Arts Center
2012, Lawrence Arts Center
2016, Hilliard Gallery, Kansas City, Missouri
2018, Bracker's Good Earth Clays, Lawrence, Kansas
2020, Bracker's Good Earth Clays, Lawrence, Kansas (final one)
