= Orton Ceramic Foundation =

The roots of the Orton Ceramic Foundation date back to the establishment of the "Standard Pyrometric Cone Company" in 1896 by Edward J. Orton, Jr. In 1894, he was appointed the first Chairman of the Ceramic Engineering Department at Ohio State University, the first ceramic engineering school in the United States.

Upon his death in 1932, in accordance with his will, a charitable trust was created to continue the "Standard Pyrometric Cone Company," now known as the "Edward Orton Jr. Ceramic Foundation", the "Orton Ceramic Foundation" or simply "Orton." The Foundation's primary objective is to offer products that facilitates and enhance high-temperature processing of ceramics and related materials. Additionally, it also strives to utilize the net proceeds from these activities towards research initiatives and studies that advance material processing for its customers.

Based in Westerville, Ohio, USA, it has three areas of products and services:

- Pyrometric monitoring devices (Pyrometric Cones, TempCheks, TempTabs, and PTCR rings) used in thermal processing operations.
- Thermal analysis instruments (dilatometers, gradient furnaces, and glass testing) designed to evaluate thermal properties of materials.
- Material testing services provided to determine material properties
