= Hermann Seger =

German ceramicist (1832–1893)

Hermann August Seger
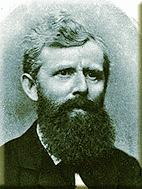
- Born: 26 December 1839
- Died: 30 October 1893 (aged 53)
- Education: University of Rostock
- Occupation: Ceramicist
- Known for: Pyrometric cones

Hermann Seger (1832–1893) was a German ceramicist who is widely credited with pioneering the development of the pyrometric cone, which enabled the rapid growth of the ceramic industry around the turn of the century.

== Biography ==
Seger was born in the German Province of Posen in 1839 to wealthy parents and studied under various ceramic scientists at the Königliche Bauakademie in Berlin (now Technische Universität Berlin).

After graduating he managed an alum and vitriol processing plant at Kreuzkirche at Neuwied on the Rhine. In 1868 he graduated from the University of Rostock and briefly managed a chemical factory in Sweden.

Seger was inspired by the significant advances being made in most fields of science and technology at the time and became interested in advancing the field of ceramic science in a similar manner. He became editor of a ceramic trade journal in 1872 and used his new position to draw attention to various advances being made abroad, such as the continuous kiln and new machinery.

Seger's 1876 essay The Constitution of Plastic Clays and the Kaolins helped promote the understanding that most clay behavior is a result of its chemical composition, paving the way for further development of ceramic studies.

In 1878 he was appointed first director of the Chemical-Technical Experiment Station at the Royal Porcelain Factory, Berlin (KPM). Soon after his arrival he was given two samples of Japanese porcelain bodies and was inspired to develop a porcelain consisting only of quartz, feldspar, and clay substance, which has since led to a variety of porcelains known as Seger porcelain.

He worked with Georg Wilhelm Timm to develop new methods of applying glazes and engobes to whiteware ceramics. Seger also experimented with glaze formulations, developing new color effects and lead-free glazes.

One of Seger's most impactful works was his 1886 essay Standard Cones for the Measurement of Temperatures in the Kilns of the Ceramic Industries, which was the first to specify formulas for pyrometric cones. These cones enabled ceramicists to gauge the heatwork experienced by ceramics through monitoring the cones' slumping during firing.

In 1890 Seger left the KPM due to declining health and spent the remainder of his life focused on editing his trade journal Thonindustrie-Zeitung. He died on 30 October 1893.

== Personal life ==
Seger married Emma Schur on 11 September 1875.

== Legacy ==
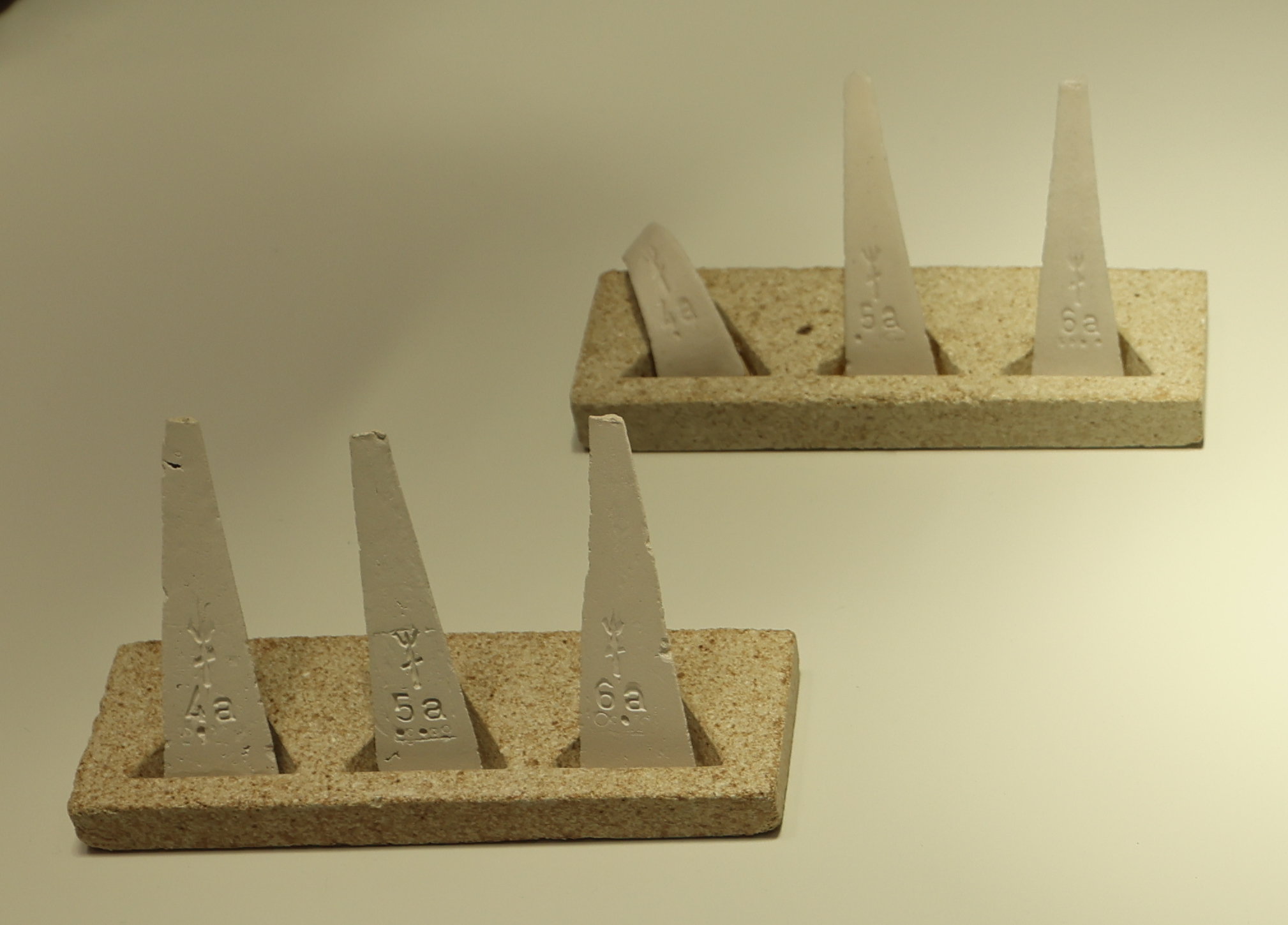
A set of fired and unfired Seger cones

Seger had a large impact on ceramic industry and art. His work helped spur greater interest in the chemistry and molecular properties of ceramics and formed the basis of most following ceramic research.

The American Ceramic Society's first action after approving their constitution was to translate the complete works of Seger, since he was considered the world's pioneering ceramicist.

He created the Seger Formula method of glaze formulations, which is sometimes referred to as the Unity Molecular Formula. It functions on the basis of viewing glazes not by their raw ingredient composition, but instead by their elemental composition by mole per cent.
