= Edward Orton Jr. =

American academic and ceramic engineer (1863–1932)

- Born: October 8, 1863; Chester, New York, U.S.
- Died: February 10, 1932 (aged 68); Columbus, Ohio
- Occupations: Academic administrator, ceramics engineer, and geologist
- Known for: First to manufacture ferrosilicon in the U.S. Developer and manufacturer of pyrometric cones
- Title: State Geologist of Ohio
- Board member of: American Ceramic Society; Ohio Institute of Mining Engineers
- Parent: Edward Orton Sr. (father)

Academic background
- Education: Ohio State University, M.E. 1894
- Thesis: Plans and Specifications for a Fire-Brick Factory

Academic work
- Discipline: Mining and Chemistry
- Sub-discipline: Ceramics engineering
- Institutions: Ohio State University; Standard Pyrometric Cone Company

Edward Orton Jr. (October 8, 1863 – February 10, 1932) was an American academic administrator, businessman, ceramic engineer, and geologist. He helped establish and was the first chairman of the ceramics department at Ohio State University, the first ceramics engineering program in the United States. He developed pyrometric cones, often called the Orton cone, and formed the Orton manufacturing company. Orton was also instrumental in the creation of the American Ceramic Society and was the first to manufacture ferrosilicon in the United States. He was the State Geologist of Ohio.

== Early life ==
Orton was born on October 8, 1863, in Chester, New York. He was the son of Mary (née Jennings) and Edward Orton Sr., a Harvard educated geologist. Shortly after his birth, his family relocated to Yellow Springs, Ohio, when his father became principal of the preparatory school of Antioch College.

In 1873, Orton began attending public school in Columbus after his father relocated the family after being appointed first president of the Ohio State Agricultural and Mechanical College. He graduated from Ohio State University with an Engineer of Mines degree in 1884. His thesis was "Plans and Specifications for a Fire-Brick Factory".

== Career ==
=== Chemist ===
Orton worked as a chemist and superintendent of coal mines and iron mines. From 1884 to 1888, Orton was a chemist and superintendent of blast furnaces. He was the first to manufacture ferrosilicon, a silicon alloy of iron, in the United States at the Bessie Furnace in New Straitsville, Ohio in 1887 and 1888. In 1888, he became the superintendent of a failing brick manufacturing plant, but was unsuccessful in his efforts to revive the company. Next, he managed several plants in Ohio until 1893. He was president of the Ohio Institute of Mining Engineers from 1893 to 1894.

=== Academic ===
Finding little published research on the brick industry, Orton drafted a bill for the Ohio General Assembly to fund a new academic program in ceramics for two years. At the same time, Orton secured funding from the Ohio Brick and Drain Tile Association and the National Brick Manufacturers' Association. Orton's "Mud Pie Bill" was passed, despite opposition, on April 20, 1894. In 1894, Orton became the first director of ceramics at Ohio State University, the first ceramic engineering school in the United States. In this capacity, he developed the curriculum for the program. He also established the Ohio Engineering Experiment Station. Orton was the dean of the Ohio State College of Engineering from 1902 to 1906 and from 1910 to 1915.

=== Manufacturer ===
Orton developed a series of pyrometric cones, often called the Orton cone. He established and ran the Standard Pyrometric Cone Company in 1896. His company originally operated from Orton Hall on the Ohio State campus from 1896, moving to London Hall in 1904. Orton built the Orton Memorial Laboratory near the Ohio State campus, where the company relocated in 1929. In accordance with his will, the Edward Orton Jr. Ceramic Foundation was formed as a charitable trust to operate the Standard Pyrometric Cone Company after his death. The foundation funded research in kiln-fired ceramics and advanced the ceramic arts and industries in the United States by selling the pyrometric cones. The cone manufacturing business moved to Westerville, Ohio in 1967, followed by the foundation in 1981. His company continues to operate today as Orton, providing services and products to seventy countries.

=== American Ceramic Society ===
In 1898, Orton was a founder of the American Ceramic Society. He served as its first secretary from 1899 to 1917 and as its president from 1930 to 1931. From this role, he performed much of the society's administrative work and played an important role in its early growth and establishment as a scientific organization. Orton was also the editor of the first nine volumes of the society’s Ceramic Transactions. He declined the salary offered to the secretary of the society, resigning in 1917 due to his military service in World War I.

=== Geologist ===
Following in his father's footsteps, Orton was also the State Geologist of Ohio from 1899 until 1906. In this capacity, he published many technical articles and reports in periodicals.

=== Military ===
During World War I, Orton aided in drafting the National Defense Act of 1916. Later that year, Orton left Ohio State and entered the United States military service. In 1917, he was commissioned a major in the Officer's Reserve Corps. On June 2, 1919, he was awarded a Distinguished Service Medal by the United States Congress. By 1919, he became a Brigadier General in the Quartermaster's Officers Reserve Corps and continued serving until he died.

== Honors ==
Orton was elected as the first honorary member of Beta Pi Kappa, now Keramos, a professional ceramic engineering fraternity. In 1922, he received an honory Doctor of Science from Rutgers College. In June 1931, he received an honorary degree of Doctor of Laws from Alfred University and a Master of Science degree of ceramic engineering from Ohio State University.

In 1933, the American Ceramic Society introduced its annual Edward Orton, Jr. Memorial Lecture. Orton's papers are housed at the Ohio State University Archives.

== Personal life ==
Orton married Mary Princess Anderson in 1888. She died in 1927. Orton married Mina Althea Orton in 1928; she died in 1932.

Orton spent much of his final years in philanthropic pursuits. He honored his father by creating and endowing the Orton Memorial Library of Geology, located inside Orton Hall at Ohio State University. In memory of his first wife, Orton purchased, created, and donated Camp Mary Orton to the Godman Guild of Columbus, which initially operated it as a summer camp and retreat for young mothers and their babies.

Orton was president of the Ohio section of the Reserve Officers Association and the Columbus Chamber of Commerce. He was a member of the Society of Colonial Wars in the State of Ohio, serving on its committee on the collection of historical documents and reports. In June 1931, Orton was the commencement speaker at Alfred University in Alfred, New York; his speech, "Parting of the Ways", warned that the Soviet Union's economic plans would force capitalist countries into a defensive position.

Orton died after several months of illness on February 10, 1932, in Columbus, Ohio at the age of 68.

== Selected publications ==
- "The Clays of Ohio and the Industries Established Upon Them". Reports of the Geological Survey of Ohio, vol. 5 (1884), pp. 643–721.
- Ceramics 6 (Clay Manufacture — Pottery) Lectures (April 11 – June 6, 1902). Columbus: Ohio State University, 1902.
- "The Progress of the Ceramic Industry". Bulletin of the University of Wisconsin. Engineering Series, vol. 2, no. 9 (1903).
- "Limestone Resources & the Lime Industry". with Samuel Vernon Peppel. Geological Survey of Ohio Bullentin no. 4, Reports of the Geological Survey of Ohio, vol. 9 (1906). pp. 1–365.
