= Heatwork =

Heatwork is the combined effect of temperature and time. It is important to several industries:

- Ceramics
- Glass and metal annealing
- Metal heat treating

While the concept of heatwork is taught in materials science courses it is not a defined measurement or scientific concept.

Pyrometric devices can be used to gauge heat work as they deform or contract due to heatwork to produce temperature equivalents. Within tolerances, firing can be undertaken at lower temperatures for a longer period to achieve comparable results. When the amount of heatwork of two firings is the same, the pieces may look identical, but there may be differences not visible, such as mechanical strength and microstructure.
