= Ohio State University College of Arts and Sciences =

College of the Ohio State University in Columbus, OH, US

The Ohio State University College Of Arts and Sciences
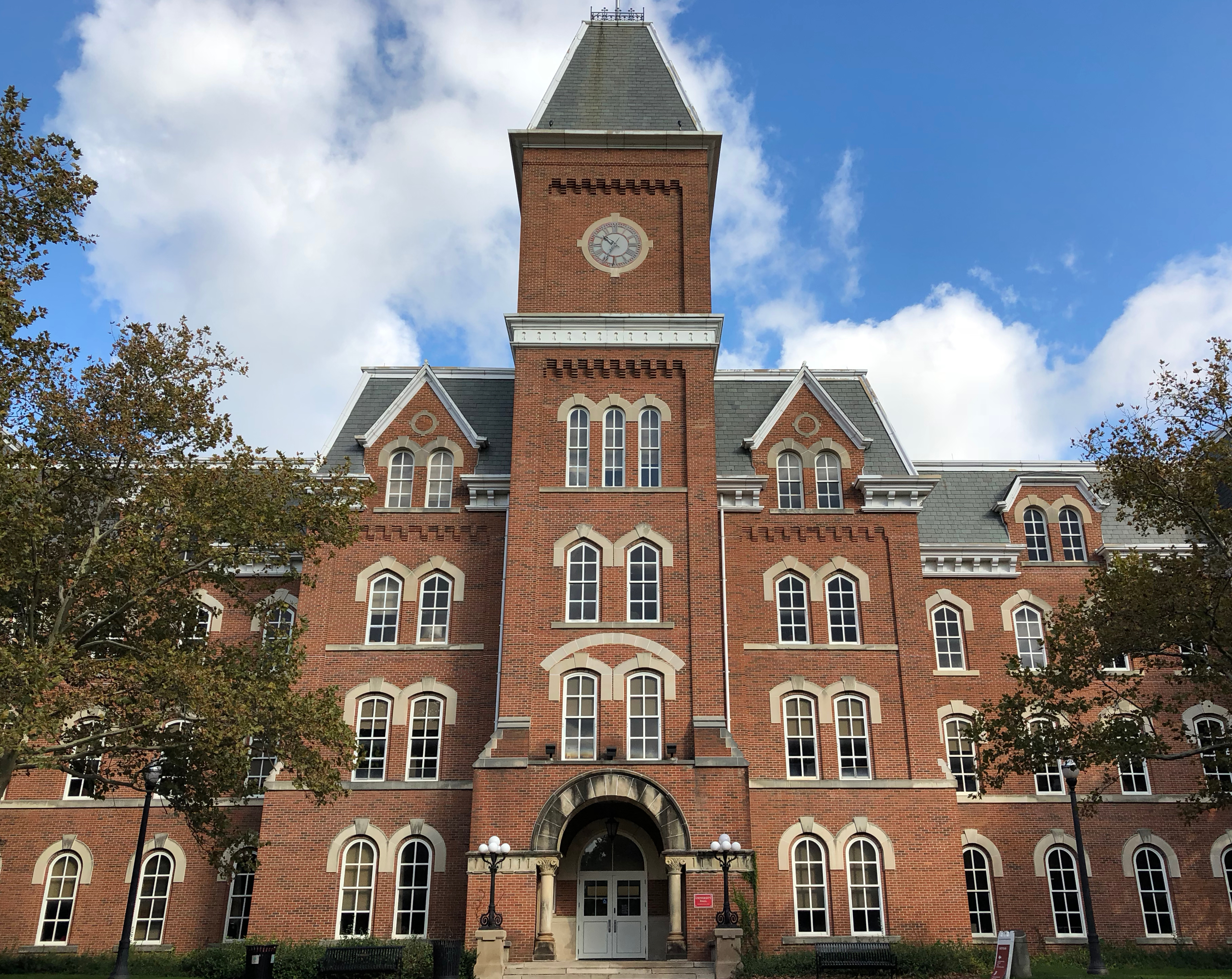
- University Hall, location of the Dean's office
- Interim Executive Dean: David Horn
- Academic staff: 1,331
- Administrative staff: 982
- Students: 19,986
- Undergraduates: 17,675
- Postgraduates: 2,311
- Location: Columbus, Ohio, USA
- Website: Official website

The College of Arts and Sciences is one of sixteen colleges at Ohio State University. The college is the largest at Ohio State, and is located in several buildings throughout its campus. The college is composed of 38 departments, and hosts over 80 different majors.

== History ==
In most years before 1968, Ohio State’s arts and sciences programs were organized within a College of Arts and Sciences. In 1968, the college divided into five colleges: the College of Arts, College of Biological Sciences, College of Humanities, College of Mathematical and Physical Sciences, and College of Social and Behavioral Sciences. Under the leadership of University President E. Gordon Gee the College of Arts and Sciences was reunified by a unanimous vote of the university’s Board of Trustees, reincorporating the five legacy colleges in 2010.

== Academics ==
The College offers majors in over 80 different academic disciplines. On a yearly basis, around half of all credit hours at Ohio State are earned through the College of Arts and Sciences. The College has produced 5 Churchill Scholars, 5 Goldwater Scholars, 1 Knight-Hennessy Scholar, and 5 Rhodes Scholars.

== Notable alumni ==
- Charles Csuri, artist
- Nancy J. Currie-Gregg, astronaut
- Steve Martino, film director
- Bebe Miller, dancer and choreographer
- Charles Newirth, American film producer
- John D. Ong, former US Ambassador to Norway
- R. L. Stine, author
