= List of Ohio State University people =

This is a list of Ohio State University people who have some significant affiliation with the school. Individuals listed may have only attended the university at one point and not necessarily have graduated. Currently, there are over 600,000 living Ohio State alumni.

== Notable alumni ==
=== Academia ===
- Michael F. Adams , former president, University of Georgia
- Omer Clyde Aderhold, former president, University of Georgia (Ph.D. 1938)
- Pierre Agostini, Emeritus professor at the Ohio State University; 2023 Nobel laureate in Physics (faculty 2005–2018
- Carol Anderson, professor of African-American studies at Emory University (Ph.D. 1995)
- T. V. Rajan Babu, professor of chemistry at Ohio State University (Ph.D. 1979)
- Steve Ballard, chancellor, East Carolina University (Ph.D. 1976)
- Mahzarin Banaji, Richard Clarke Cabot Professor of Social Ethics at Harvard University (M.A. 1982, Ph.D. 1986)
- John Bardo, educator, president of Wichita State University, chancellor of Western Carolina University (Ph.D. 1973)
- Grace Marie Bareis, mathematician and assistant professor at Ohio State University
- James M. Bobbitt, professor of chemistry at the University of Connecticut (Ph.D. 1955)
- James Bonk, longtime chemistry professor, Duke University (Ph.D. 1958)
- Lakeyta Bonnette-Bailey, academic
- Douglas Brinkley, director of the Theodore Roosevelt Center for American Civilization at Tulane University (B.A. 1982)
- Molly Corbett Broad, president of the University of North Carolina System (M.S. 1964)
- Paul H. Buck, historian; former provost of Harvard University; awarded 1938 Pulitzer Prize in History (B.A. 1921, M.A. 1922)
- Calvin Adam Buehler, professor and chair of the Chemistry Department at University of Tennessee (B.S. 1918, M.S. 1920, Ph.D. 1922)
- Robert Buzzanco, professor and chair of the History Department at the University of Houston (Ph.D.)
- Neil W. Chamberlain, economist and industrial relations scholar at Yale and Columbia Universities (Ph.D. 1942)
- Roger A. Coate, political scientist, former professor at the University of South Carolina
- Leon Cooper, founder and director of the Institute for Brain and Neural Systems at Brown Univeristy; 1972 Nobel laureate in Physics (faculty 1957–1958)
- Phyllis Worthy Dawkins, 18th president of Bennett College (Ph.D. 1984)
- Tamal Dey, former professor and chair of the department of computer science and engineering at the Ohio State University
- Charles Edgar Dickinson, landscape architect and faculty at Lincoln University (B.A., M.S., Ph.D. 1950)
- Helen G. Edmonds, professor of history at North Carolina Central University, first black woman to earn a Ph.D. at Ohio State (1946)
- Paul Flory, 1974 Nobel laureate in Chemistry; professor at Cornell University and Stanford University (Ph.D. 1934)
- William A. Fowler, 1983 Nobel laureate in Physics; professor at Cal Tech (B.S. 1933)
- Algeania Freeman, president of Wilberforce University, Martin University, and Livingstone College (Ph.D. 1977)
- Perry A. Frey, professor of biochemistry at University of Wisconsin–Madison (B.S. 1959)
- Harold J. Grimm, professor of History; expert on the Protestant Reformation (PhD)
- John R. Halstead, president of SUNY-Brockport (Ph.D. 1980)
- Judy Hample, president of the University of Mary Washington (B.A.; M.A.; Ph.D.)
- Mantaro Hashimoto, professor at the University of Hawaii, Osaka City University, Princeton University, and Institute for Asian and African Languages and Cultures, Tokyo University of Foreign Studies
- Harlan Hatcher, former president (1951–1968) of the University of Michigan (B.A.; M.A.; Ph.D.)
- Larry L. Hench, emeritus professor at the University of Florida and chair of the Ceramic Materials Department at Imperial College London (B.S. 1961, Ph.D. 1964)
- Sam Higginbottom, missionary and founder of Allahabad Agricultural Institute
- Christopher Hirata, astrophysicist (faculty)
- Charles F. Hockett, linguist, professor at Cornell University (B.A./M.A. 1936)
- Philip G. Hoffman, former president of the University of Houston (1961–1977); first chancellor of the University of Houston System (1977–1979) (Ph.D. 1948)
- Michael Hogan, former history professor; former president of the University of Connecticut; former president of the University of Illinois
- Kathryn Jablokow, engineer and professor at Penn State Great Valley School of Graduate Professional Studies
- Jacquelyne Jackson, sociologist and academic (Ph.D., 1960)
- Donald Kagan, scholar, Sterling Professor of Classics and History at Yale (Ph.D., 1958)
- Ellyn Kaschak, emeritus professor of Psychology, Ohio State University (Ph.D., 1974)
- David Kier, professor of History, specializing in modern Germany and Russia (Ph.D.)
- George Kohlrieser, professor of Leadership and Organizational Behavior, Institute for Management Development IMD, Lausanne (Ph.D., 1988)
- John L. Koprowski, dean of the Haub School of Environment & Natural Resources University of Wyoming, director of the School of Environment and Natural Resources University of Arizona, conservation biologist (B.S. Zoology 1983)
- Murray Krieger, literary critic and theorist, professor at the University of Iowa and the University of California, Irvine (Ph.D. 1952)
- Vijay Kumar, professor in the School of Engineering & Applied Sciences at the University of Pennsylvania (M.Sc. 1985; Ph.D. 1987)
- Lois Lampe, botanist and educator, professor emerita (Bachelor of Arts and Bachelor of Science in 1919, Master of Science in 1922 and a Ph.D. in 1927)
- Arthur Lucas, principal of King's College London (1993–2003) (Ph.D.)
- Dan Masys (MD, 1974), affiliate professor of Biomedical and Health Informatics at the University of Washington
- David Warren Maurer, professor of linguistics at the University of Louisville; author of numerous studies of the language of the American underworld (Ph.D.)
- Oliver McGee, chair of the Department of Civil & Environmental Engineering & Geodetic Science at the Ohio State University (2001–2005) (B.S. 1981)
- Raymond Mikesell, economist; participant in the Bretton Woods Conference (B.S. Ph.D.)
- Ruth Ella Moore, professor and department head at Howard University (B.S. 1926, M.A. 1927, Ph.D. 1933)
- Richard Thacker Morris, professor and chairman of sociology at the University of California, Los Angeles (Ph.D. 1952)
- Gwendolyn O'Neal, home economist and interim president of Bennett College (Ph.D. 1977)
- Edward Orton Jr., dean of the College of Engineering and first director of ceramics at Ohio State University (E.M. 1884)
- Henry Panion, III, professor and chairman in the Department of Music at the University of Alabama at Birmingham (Ph.D.)
- Jason Pigg, political scietnist
- Calie Pistorius, vice chancellor and principal of the University of Pretoria in South Africa (M.S. 1984; Ph.D. 1986)
- Wynetka Ann Reynolds, former president of the University of Alabama at Birmingham (1997–2003); former chancellor of the City University of New York (1990–1997); former chancellor of the California State University system (1982–1990)
- Elliott J. Rouse, mechanical engineer, roboticist, and academic
- Michael J. Saks, professor of law and psychology at Arizona State University; president of the American Psychology-Law Society; editor of the scientific journal Law and Human Behavior (Ph.D., 1975)
- W. Sherman Savage, professor of history at Lincoln University (1921–1960); first African-American to earn a doctorate from Ohio State (Ph.D. 1934)
- Arthur M. Schlesinger, Sr., historian, namesake of Schlesinger Library at Harvard University (B.A. 1910)
- Gene Sharp, political scientist; founder of the Albert Einstein Institution (B.A. 1949; M.A. 1951)
- Amit P. Sheth, professor at Wright State University and director of Kno.e.sis Center (M.S. 1983; Ph.D. 1985)
- Claude Steele, professor of psychology at Stanford University (Ph.D. 1971)
- Ray T. Stull (M.E. 1902), professor and head of ceramic engineering at the University of Illinois; chief of the heavy clay section of the United States Bureau of Standards and chief ceramist of the United States Bureau of Mines
- Paul Torgersen, president of Virginia Tech (M.S. 1956; Ph.D. 1959)
- Galal Walker, Chinese language professor and resource center director
- Charles E. Waring, physical chemist and professor at the University of Connecticut (M.S. 1934, Ph.D. 1936)
- Quentin D. Wheeler, president, State University of New York College of Environmental Science and Forestry (BS 1976; MS 1977; PhD 1980)
- Nancy L. Zimpher, chancellor, State University of New York system (BA 1968; M.A. 1971; Ph.D. 1976)
- Therese Zink, family physician, academic, and author (MD 1985)

=== Activism and nonprofits ===
- Wilson A. Head, sociologist, activist in race relations, peace and the abolition of prisons (doctoral degree in Sociology, Adult Education, and Social Psychology, 1958)
- Ammon Hennacy, Christian pacifist, anarchist, Wobbly, social activist, and member of the Catholic Worker Movement
- Bill Kraus, gay rights and AIDS activist; former Congressional aide who served as a liaison between the San Francisco gay community and congress in the 1980s
- Ann Shaw (1921–2015), civic leader and social worker based in Los Angeles, California (M.S. Speech, 1944)
- Faye Wattleton, activist; former president of Planned Parenthood of America; co-founder of Center for the Advancement of Women (B.S. 1964)

=== Art and architecture ===
- Berenice Abbott, photographer (attended briefly)
- Nick Anderson, Pulitzer Prize-winning cartoonist
- Natalia Arbelaez (M.F.A. 2015) ceramicist, sculptor, and educator
- Brian Basset, cartoonist and painter; editorial cartoonist for The Seattle Times 1978–1994; creator of the comic strip Adam@Home 1984–2009, creator of the comic strip Red and Rover 2000– (1975–1978; attended but did not graduate)
- George Wesley Bellows, painter (1905) (attended but did not graduate)
- Milton Caniff, cartoonist (1930)
- Charles Csuri, artist and scholar; father of digital art and computer animation (BFA; MFA)
- Ray Evans, editorial cartoonist
- Jan Groover, photographer noted for her use of emerging color technologies (M.A. 1970)
- Kerry G. Johnson, caricaturist and cartoonist (B.F.A 1989)
- Samella Lewis, artist, printmaker, art historian and scholar of African-American art, first African-American woman to receive a doctorate in fine arts and art history (M.A. 1948; Ph.D. 1951)
- Roy Lichtenstein, artist (BFA, 1946; MFA, 1949; honorary doctorate, 1988)
- Rick Mills, art educator, glass artist (BFA, 1980)
- Paul Palnik, cartoon artist and writer; some original drawings are in the collection of the Ohio State University Libraries (BFA, 1968; MA 1969)
- Joseph W. Papin, reportorial artist, illustrator, courtroom artist, editorial artist (B.A. 1955)
- Christopher Ries, glass sculptor (BFA, 1975)
- Wallace Clement Sabine, architect; founder of the field of modern architectural acoustics; acoustical architect of Boston's Symphony Hall (B.S. 1886)
- Howard Dwight Smith, Ohio Stadium architect (B.S. 1907)
- Jeff Smith, Eisner Award-winning cartoonist; creator of the comic book series Bone (B.A.)
- Julia Suits, cartoonist for The New Yorker (M.F.A., Sculpture, 1982)
- Graeme Sullivan, artist, author, art theorist, and educator (M.A. and Ph.D. 1984)
- Jon Whitcomb, illustrator whose style became highly influential in mid-century American magazines (B.A.)

=== Business ===
- Dan Amstutz, expert on agricultural trade with Goldman Sachs, as Ambassador and Chief Negotiator for Agriculture during the Uruguay Round General Agreement on Tariffs and Trade and later executive director of the International Wheat Council in London, England (B.S. 1954)
- Max M. Fisher, philanthropist and businessman; significant donor to and the namesake of the Fisher College of Business at Ohio State (B.S. 1930)
- Mark Frissora, former CEO of Caesars Entertainment, former CEO of The Hertz Corporation and Tenneco (B.A. 1977)
- Yang Huiyan, real estate developer; China's wealthiest woman (B.A.)
- Paul F. Iams, founder of Iams (B.S. 1937)
- William M. Isaac, board member and chairman, Federal Deposit Insurance Corporation (J.D., summa cum laude,1969)
- Vyomesh Joshi, executive vice president, HP Imaging and Printing Group (M.S. Electrical Engineering 1980)
- Fred Lazarus Jr., founder of Federated Department Stores
- John C. Lincoln, inventor, entrepreneur, philanthropist; 1924 vice-presidential candidate under the Commonwealth Land Party ticket; held 55 patents on several electrical devices, founded the Lincoln Electric Co.
- Abraham M. Lurie, developer of Marina del Rey
- Seth Metcalf, executive at financial technology companies Bold Penguin and SoLo Funds and former deputy treasurer of Ohio
- Robert E. Murray, founder and CEO of Murray Energy Corporation, one of the largest coal mine operators in the world
- Phuthuma Nhleko, CEO of MTN Group, South Africa's largest telecommunications company (B.S. 1983)
- Walden O'Dell, CEO of Diebold
- Edward J. Orton, Jr., founded the Standard Pyrometric Cone Company
- Alan Patricof, venture capitalist and founder of Apax Partners (B.S.)
- Frederick Patterson, first African-American to manufacture cars with C.R. Patterson and Sons; developed the Patterson-Greenfield car and was in direct competition with Henry Ford's Model T
- Tahira Rehmatullah, businesswoman and advocate for cannabis reform
- James E. Rohr, chairman and CEO of PNC Financial Services Group (B.S. M.B.A.)
- Frederick Gale Ruffner Jr., founder and former owner of Gale Research (B.A., 1950)
- Robert R. Ruffolo, Jr, senior vice president of Wyeth; president of Wyeth Research (B.S. 1973; Ph.D. 1976)
- Alex Schoenbaum, founder of Shoney's Restaurants (B.S. 1939)
- Deven Sharma, president, Standard & Poor's (Ph.D.)
- George Steinbrenner, one-time head of Cleveland's American Shipbuilding Company; former owner of the New York Yankees, (M.A. 1955)
- Ratmir Timashev, founder and former CEO of Veeam Software (M.S. 1996)
- Leslie Wexner, CEO, chairman and founder of Limited Brands corporation (B.S. 1959)
- Mark Whitacre, COO of Cypress Systems (B.S. M.S. 1979)
- Kenny Yap, executive chairman of Qian Hu Corporation

=== Entertainment ===
- Lee Adams, songwriter; Tony Award winner; inductee into the Songwriters Hall of Fame (B.A.)
- James Akins (B.M. 1978; M.M. 1982), principal tubist, Columbus Symphony Orchestra
- Carole Black, president and CEO of Lifetime Entertainment Services (B.A. 1965)
- Budd Boetticher, film director of classic Westerns, many starring Randolph Scott
- Ned Brooks, moderator, Meet the Press
- Jack Buck, Hall of Fame announcer for the St. Louis Cardinals, NFL football announcer
- Marc Butan, film producer and founder of MadRiver Pictures (B.A. 1992)
- Ross Butler, actor, 13 Reasons Why
- Margaret Carson, longtime publicist for Leonard Bernstein and Benny Goodman
- Christine Chubbuck, television reporter who committed suicide on live television in 1974
- Kim Deal, musician, member of The Breeders, formerly of The Pixies and The Amps
- John Donkin, producer of 2007 Academy Award-nominated animated short No Time for Nuts (M.S. 1986)
- Tim Easton, musician alt-country singer
- Mark Eitzel, musician, member of The Naked Skinnies
- Ruby Elzy, break-through African-American operatic soprano who created the role of Serena in George Gershwin's folk opera Porgy and Bess (B.S. 1930)
- Dudley Fisher, nationally syndicated cartoonist most known for the Right Around Home strip (did not graduate)
- Alan Freed, disc jockey, widely credited with coining the term "rock and roll"
- Charles W. Fries, film producer and former vice president of Columbia Pictures, originated the Movie of the Week format (B.A.)
- Steve Gordon, screenwriter and film director (Arthur) (1961)
- Don Handfield, film producer, writer, co-creator of Knightfall on History Channel and producer of The Founder (B.A.)
- Patricia Heaton, Emmy Award-winning actress on Everybody Loves Raymond (B.A., 1980)
- Eileen Heckart, Academy Award, Emmy Award, and Golden Globe Award-winning actress (B.A., 1942)
- Velina Hasu Houston, playwright
- Pee Wee Hunt, jazz trombonist, who had a number one hit with the "Twelfth Street Rag" in 1948
- Kermit Hunter, playwright (B.A. 1931)
- Toni-Leslie James, costume designer (BFA 1979)
- Jim Jinkins, animator and creator of the animated Doug television series
- Tyler Joseph, musician and lead singer of the alternative rock duo Twenty One Pilots
- Melina Kanakaredes, actress, star of Providence and CSI: NY (attended but did not graduate)
- James C. Katz, film restoration expert responsible for restoring the original prints of Rear Window, Lawrence of Arabia and My Fair Lady (B.A. 1960)
- Joe Kenda, host of Investigation Discovery documentary series Homicide Hunter (M.A. 1970)
- Reuben Klamer, creator of Milton-Bradley's The Game of Life
- Gia Kourlas, dance critic for The New York Times
- Fred Ladd (né Laderman), producer (B.S. 1949)
- Jerome Lawrence, playwright (B.A. 1937)
- Brian Lehrer, radio host of The Brian Lehrer Show on New York's WNYC (M.A.)
- Aleen Leslie, screenwriter
- Gary LeVox, lead singer of the country music group Rascal Flatts
- Richard Lewis, comedian, actor, writer (B.S. 1969)
- Dave Malkoff, Weather Channel correspondent and six-time Emmy Award recipient
- Patrick Markey, producer of films including A River Runs Through It and White Oleander (B.A.; M.A.)
- Roger McMurrin, conductor and Presbyterian pastor
- Vince Mendoza, musician and composer of jazz (B.A. 1983)
- Stephen Montague, composer and worldwide touring musician (2000 distinguished alumnus) (Ph.D. 1972)
- Erin Moriarty, CBS News correspondent and nine-time Emmy Award recipient (B.S. 1973; J.D. 1977)
- Ric Ocasek, member of rock group The Cars
- Phil Ochs, 1960s and 70s folk and protest singer and progressive activist (attended journalism school but did not graduate)
- Of a Revolution, rock band of members Marc Roberge, Chris Culos, Richard On, Benj Gershman, and Jerry DePizzo
- Ron O'Neal, actor, Superfly
- Ross Patterson, actor and screenwriter (B.A. 1999)
- Jean Peters, varsity cheerleader, Miss Ohio State University, actress, second wife of Howard Hughes
- Coyote Peterson, YouTuber and wildlife educator at his channel Brave Wilderness
- Jack Renner, founder and CEO of TELARC Classical Records; nominated for 20 Grammy Awards, winning nine (B.S.)
- Gigi Rice, actress (B.A. 1987)
- Kristen Ruhlin, actress, Human Giant, She Wants Me, The Girl in the Park
- Ed Sabol, filmmaker, producer, multiple Emmy Award winner, member of the Pro Football Hall of Fame, co-founder of NFL Films
- Fred Silverman, trendsetting 1970s television executive as president of ABC
- Randy Skinner, director, choreographer, performer (B.S. in Education, 1974)
- Larry Smith, puppeteer and producer of children's programming in the Cincinnati area since 1957
- Frank Stanton, longtime president of CBS, 1946–73
- Richard Stoltzman, musician, Avery Fisher Prize-winning clarinetist, Sony Classical recording artist (B.A. Music / B.S. Mathematics)
- Nell Tangeman, singer
- Bruce Vilanch, comedy writer (BFA, 1970)
- Chris Wedge, director of computer animation films including Ice Age and Robots (M.A. Computer Graphics)
- Nar Williams, host of the Science Channel's Science of the Movies
- Norma Jean Wright, lead singer of the late 70s disco band Chic
- Dwight Yoakam, country musician, actor

=== Journalism ===
- Andrew Anglin, American neo-Nazi and founder of the white supremacist website The Daily Stormer
- Les Biederman, sports writer, columnist and editor for The Pittsburgh Press (B.A. 1930)
- Walt Bogdanich, Pulitzer Prize for Specialized Reporting 1988; Pulitzer Prize for National Reporting 2005; Pulitzer Prize for Investigative Reporting 2008 (M.A. 1976)
- Leonard Downie Jr., journalist, executive editor, Washington Post (B.A. 1964, M.A. 1965)
- Hugh Fullerton, sportswriter, uncovered the Black Sox Scandal
- Julia Keller, columnist for Chicago Tribune; 2005 Pulitzer Prize recipient (Ph.D. 1995)
- W.M. Kiplinger, founder of Kiplinger's
- Joel Meyerowitz, photojournalist, Guggenheim Fellow chronicler of the aftermath of the World Trade Center attack (B.A. 1959)
- Judith Miller, former New York Times reporter, 2002 Pulitzer Prize for Explanatory Reporting (attended briefly)
- Jerry Mitchell, investigative reporter for The Clarion-Ledger (M.A.)
- Reynelda Muse, first woman and first African-American to anchor a television news program in Colorado (B.A. 1968)
- Jim Schaefer, Pulitzer Prize for Local Reporting with the Detroit Free Press 2009
- Bill Stewart, reporter, foreign correspondent for ABC executed by Nicaraguan government forces (B.A. 1963)
- Diana Sugg, Pulitzer Prize for Best Reporting 2003 (M.A. 1992)
- David Teeuwen (1970–2015), managing editor of USA Today, where he helped pioneer digital news
- Earl Wilson, New York Post (B.S. 1931)

=== Law ===
- Brent Benjamin, chief justice of the West Virginia Supreme Court (B.A., J.D.)
- Benjamin Michael Flowers, 10th solicitor general of Ohio (2019–2023)
- John W. Grabiel, Republican gubernatorial nominee in Arkansas in 1922 and 1924, attorney in Fayetteville, Arkansas (1900)
- Claude M. Hilton, United States District Court judge for the Eastern District of Virginia, judge on the Foreign Intelligence Surveillance Court (B.S. 1963)
- Colleen McMahon, United States judge for the Southern District of New York (B.A. 1973)
- Thomas J. Moyer, chief justice of the Ohio Supreme Court (B.A. 1961 J.D. 1964)
- C. William O'Neill, one-term governor of Ohio, chief justice of the Ohio Supreme Court (JD 1942)
- Paul Pfeifer, justice of the Ohio Supreme Court (B.A. 1963 J.D. 1966)
- H. Anna Quinby, first woman from Ohio admitted to practice law before the U.S. Supreme Court
- Brian Sandoval, 29th governor of Nevada, former Nevada attorney general; former United States District Court judge (J.D. 1989)
- Evelyn Lundberg Stratton, justice of the Ohio Supreme Court (J.D. 1978)
- Jeffrey Sutton, federal appeals court judge on the United States Court of Appeals for the Sixth Circuit (J.D. 1990)

=== Literature ===
- John Backderf (also known as Derf; BA), political and satirical writer, cartoonist
- Lois McMaster Bujold, science fiction novelist (attended but did not graduate)
- Ron Burch, writer (BS; MA)
- Rosaria Butterfield, author (PhD 1992)
- Harlan Ellison, science fiction writer (attended but did not graduate; expelled)
- Dorothy Canfield Fisher, novelist and education activist (B.A. 1899)
- Brian Gage, author of satire, fairy tales, and fiction (B.S. 1996)
- Virginia Hamilton, author (M.A. 1958)
- Karen Harper, author (B.A. 1967, M.A. 1969)
- Chester Himes, "the black Raymond Chandler"; writer of hard-boiled detective novels including Cotton Comes to Harlem (attended one year only)
- John Jakes, author (M.A. 1954)
- Adrienne Kennedy, playwright, multiple Obie Award recipient, Guggenheim Fellow (B.A. 1953)
- David Kier, novelist and historian
- Betina Krahn, author (B.S.)
- Judith McCulloh, folklorist, ethnomusicologist, and university press editor (M.A.)
- Aimee Nezhukumatathil, poet (B.A. and M.F.A. 1996/2000)
- Mary Oliver, Pulitzer Prize for Poetry 1984 (attended briefly)
- Cynthia Ozick, author (M.A., 1950)
- Clayton Rawson, mystery writer (B.A. 1929)
- Frank Schmalleger, professor and author (Ph.D., 1974)
- Loren Singer, screenwriter and novelist (B.A., 1947)
- Maggie Smith, poet, freelance writer, and editor (MFA)
- Samuel Steward, professor and author (see also Phil Andros) (Ph.D., 1934)
- R. L. Stine, children's author of Goosebumps series (B.A., 1965)
- James Thurber, author and humorist (attended but did not graduate

=== Medicine ===
- Marie Skodak Crissey, developmental and educational psychologist, served as president of two divisions of the American Psychological Association (Undergraduate education; Master's in clinical psychology, 1931)
- Paul Ebert, pediatric heart surgeon; former director of the American College of Surgeons; former chairman of the Departments of Surgery at both Cornell University Medical College and the University of California San Francisco Medical Center (B.S. M.D)
- Judah Folkman, scientist; Harvard medical researcher; cancer researcher (B.S. 1953)
- Barbara A. Given, nursing professor and psychosocial oncologist
- Erica Glasper, behavioral neuroscientist (M.A. Psychology)
- Henry W. Hofstetter, past president of the American Optometric Association and a member of the National Optometry Hall of Fame (M.S. 1940, Ph.D. 1942)
- Wolfram Samlowski, oncologist
- Betty Schmoll, founder of Hospice of Dayton, one of the first hospice programs in the United States (M.S. 1978)

=== Military ===
- Robert Bales, former United States Army soldier responsible for the Kandahar massacre (left 1996, didn't graduate)
- Jesse L. Brown, first African-American Navy pilot, received the Navy Distinguished Flying Cross
- Clovis E. Byers, chief of staff, Eighth United States Army
- Walter J. Davis Jr., United States Navy vice admiral (B.S.)
- Robert L. Eichelberger, superintendent of the United States Military Academy; commander of the Eighth United States Army in the South West Pacific theater in World War II
- Stanley H. Ford, United States Army general (Bachelor of Philosophy 1898)
- Henry J. Hatch, engineer, lieutenant general, former Army chief of Engineers (M.S.)
- Curtis LeMay, United States Air Force general (World War II and Cold War) (B.S. 1928)
- Geoffrey Miller, United States Army major general (B.A.)
- John M. Murray, United States Army, general
- Robert W. Parker, United States Air Force general
- Robert R. Scott, awarded the Medal of Honor in World War II; namesake of destroyer escort USS Scott (DE-214) and OSU's Scott House dormitory
- Douglas M. Webster, lieutenant junior grade, U.S. Navy; lost in the Pacific Ocean December 5, 1965, when his A-4 Skyhawk, armed with a B43 nuclear bomb, rolled off the elevator of the USS Ticonderoga (CVA-14) in a Broken Arrow not acknowledged by the Pentagon until 1981

=== Politics ===
==== U.S. presidents and vice presidents ====
- Rutherford B. Hayes, Civil War general, two-time Ohio governor, and later president of the United States who is given credit, while governor, for turning the early Ohio State Agricultural & Mechanical School into the comprehensive Ohio State University
- JD Vance, 50th vice president of the United States (2025–present), United States senator from Ohio (2023–2025)

==== United States representatives ====
- Troy Balderson, Ohio's 12th congressional district (B.A. 1984)
- Laurie Calvin Battle, U.S. representative from Alabama (M.A. 1939)
- Sherrod Brown, United States senator from Ohio, 2007-2025 (M.A., 1981)
- Mike Carey, Ohio's 15th congressional district
- Thomas R. Carper, United States senator from Delaware, 2001-2025 (B.A., 1968)
- Israel Moore Foster, U.S. representative from Ohio
- Bob Gibbs, Ohio's 7th congressional district (A.A.S., 1974)
- Anthony Gonzalez, U.S. representative from Ohio, 2019–2023
- Dave Hobson, Ohio's 7th congressional district (J.D. 1963)
- James Jordan, Ohio's 4th congressional district (B.A.; M.A.); assistant wrestling coach, 1987–1995
- Mary Jo Kilroy, Ohio's 15th congressional district
- Ron Klein, Florida's 22nd congressional district (B.A. 1979)
- Kristina Knickerbocker, U.S. representative, as of 2027, from Ohio
- Alan Lowenthal, California's 47th congressional district (M.S. Ph.D.)
- William M. McCulloch, twelve-term former congressman from Ohio (J.D. 1925)
- Howard Metzenbaum, former United States senator (B.A., 1939; J.D., 1941)
- William H. Natcher, fifteen-term former congressman from Kentucky, noted for never taking political contributions (J.D. 1933)
- Mike Oxley, former U.S. representative from Ohio's 4th district (J.D. 1969)
- Deborah Pryce, former congresswoman of Ohio's 15th congressional district (B.A. 1973)
- William B. Saxbe, United States senator from Ohio, United States attorney general, United States ambassador to India (BA 1940; JD 1948)
- Robert M. Switzer, former United States representative from Ohio
- Steve Stivers, Ohio's 15th congressional district (B.A. 1989)
- Pat Tiberi, Ohio's 12th congressional district (B.A., 1985)
- George Voinovich, former United States senator from Ohio; former governor of Ohio (J.D.)
- John M. Vorys, nine-term former congressman from Ohio, 1951 delegate to the United Nations (J.D. 1923)
- Chalmers P. Wylie, thirteen-term former congressman from Ohio (B.A.)

==== Diplomats ====
- Ljubica Acevska, Macedonian ambassador to the United States (B.A.)
- Amadou Lamine Ba, Senegal ambassador to the United States (B.S. M.S. Ph.D.)
- Chester Crocker, former Undersecretary of State for African Affairs; author of United Nations' Namibian Peace Plan (B.A. 1963)
- Alan Fiers, key figure in the Iran-Contra Affair as head of the Central Intelligence Agency's Central American Task Force 1984–1988 (B.A.)
- Foy D. Kohler, United States ambassador to the Soviet Union (B.A.)
- Paul A. Russo, ambassador of the United States to Barbados, Dominica, St Lucia, Antigua, St. Vincent, and St. Christopher-Nevis-Anguilla, 1986–1988
- Milton A. Wolf, former United States ambassador to Austria (B.A. 1948)

==== Governors ====
- Chester Hardy Aldrich, governor of Nebraska and former justice of the Nebraska Supreme Court (B.A. 1888)
- John W. Bricker, governor of Ohio; Republican vice presidential nominee in 1944; two-term United States senator from Ohio (B.A. 1916; J.D. 1920)
- John Kasich, governor and former congressman from Central Ohio (B.A. 1974)
- James A. Rhodes, governor of Ohio; former mayor of Columbus, Ohio; former Ohio state auditor (attended but did not graduate)
- Roberto Sánchez Vilella, second elected governor of Puerto Rico (B.S. 1934)

===== State legislatures =====
- Javier Rivera Aquino, member of the Puerto Rico House of Representatives; secretary of the Puerto Rico Department of Agriculture (B.S. 1996)
- William G. Batchelder, Ohio representative from the 69th district
- Andrew Brenner, Ohio representative from the 2nd district
- John Patrick Carney, Ohio representative from the 22nd district
- Kathleen Clyde, Ohio representative from the 68th district
- Tony Dale, Republican member of the Texas House of Representatives from suburban Austin, Texas (B.A. Political Science)
- Mike Duffey, Ohio representative from the 21st district
- Grace Towns Hamilton, first African-American woman elected to the Georgia General Assembly (Masters in Psychology 1929)
- Bill Hayes, Ohio representative from the 91st district
- Brian Hill, Ohio representative from the 94th district
- Jim Hughes, Ohio senator from the 16th district
- Kris Jordan, Ohio senator from the 19th district
- Robert S. Kiss, speaker, West Virginia Legislature (B.A. J.D.)
- Ron Klein, minority leader, Florida Senate (B.A. 1979)
- Frank LaRose, Ohio senator from the 27th district
- Clayton Luckie, Ohio representative from the 39th district
- Rob McColley, 97th president of the Ohio Senate from the 1st district
- Lauren McNally, Ohio representative from the 59th district
- Tom Niehaus, 93rd president of the Ohio Senate from the 14th district
- Larry Obhof, 95th president of the Ohio Senate from the 22nd district
- Kevin Olickal, member of the Illinois House of Representatives (B.S. 2015)
- Bob Peterson, Ohio representative from the 85th district
- Larry Price, Ohio representative from the 26th district
- Dan Ramos, Ohio representative from the 56th district
- Don Reed, member of the Florida House of Representatives
- Robert Shaw, Ohio senator from the 16th district, 1967–1972
- Stephen Slesnick, Ohio representative from the 52nd district
- Peter Stautberg, Ohio representative from the 34th district
- Gerald Stebelton, Ohio representative from the 5th district
- Fred Strahorn, Ohio representative from the 39th district
- Mark Wagoner, Ohio senator from the 2nd district

==== Local politicians ====
- Aftab Pureval, mayor of Cincinnati
- Jack Ford, first African-American mayor of Toledo
- Richard A. Heyman (c. 1935–1994), mayor of Key West Florida, one of the first openly gay politicians in the US (1957)
- Greg Lashutka, 51st mayor of Columbus, former tight end for the Ohio State Buckeyes football team
- James H. McGee, longest-serving mayor of Dayton, Ohio (J.D.)
- Tom Moody, 49th mayor of Columbus
- Buck Rinehart, 50th mayor of Columbus
- Michael R. White, mayor of Cleveland (B.A. 1973, MPA 1974)

==== Other U.S. politicians and government ====
- Amy Acton, director of Ohio Department of Health during the COVID-19 pandemic (MPH)
- William Byron Colver (1870–1926), chairman of the Federal Trade Commission (1891)
- Dan Crippen, former director of the Congressional Budget Office (M.A. 1976, Ph.D. 1981)
- Stephen Kappes, deputy director of the Central Intelligence Agency
- Oliver McGee, former U.S. deputy assistant secretary of Transportation for Technology Policy (1999–2001) (B.S. 1981)
- Dillon S. Myer, director of War Relocation Authority during World War II and commissioner of Bureau of Indian Affairs (1914)
- Dat Tran, acting United States Secretary of Veterans Affairs under Joe Biden

==== Non-American politicians and officials ====
- Grant Devine, former Progressive Conservative premier of the Canadian province of Saskatchewan (Ph.D. 1976)
- Cheikh Tidiane Gadio, Senegal Minister of Foreign Affairs (Ph.D.)
- Andrew McIntosh, British Labour Party politician, whip and culture spokesman of the House of Lords
- Abdinur Sheikh Mohamed, Somali educator and politician; former Minister of Education, Higher Education and Culture of Somalia
- Jayaprakash Narayan, Indian freedom fighter, social reformer, politician
- Stephen Oru, minister of the Federal Republic of Nigeria
- Duvvuri Subbarao, governor of the Reserve Bank of India (B.S.; M.S. 1978)
- Joseph Wu, former chairman of the Mainland Affairs Council; first and only non-KMT-affiliated representative to the United States of the Republic of China (Ph.D. 1989)
- Feng Yunhe, Chinese politician, Minister of Textile Industry 1949–1954, considered to be first woman to earn PhD in chemical engineering in US.

=== Science and engineering ===
- Homer Burton Adkins, organic chemist who developed the Adkins catalyst (Ph.D. 1918)
- Charles Bassett, astronaut
- Hendrik Wade Bode, scientist and engineer with numerous civilian and military contributions (B.S. 1924, M.S. 1926)
- Margaret W. "Hap" Brennecke, NASA metallurgist who contributed to the Saturn rocket program
- Thomas D. Brock, microbiologist who discovered hyperthermophiles living in hot springs at Yellowstone National Park
- Ralph Compton, electrical engineer
- Nancy J. Currie, astronaut on STS-57, STS-70, STS-88, STS-109 (B.A. 1980)
- Melvin De Groote, prolific chemist, with the second most patents in the US, next to Edison
- Agnes Meyer Driscoll, cryptanalyst deciphered Japanese Naval Codes before and during World War II (B.A. 1911)
- Jewell James Ebers, transistor engineer (MS 1947, PhD 1950)
- Bertha Lamme Feicht, first female engineering graduate; first female engineer to be hired by Westinghouse (B.S. 1893)
- Gerard Fowke, geologist and archeaologist
- Rod Holt, developed the unique method of power supply for Apple Inc.'s 1977 Apple II
- David A. Huffman, computer scientist (B.S. 1944, M.S. 1949)
- Christina Hulbe, Antarctic researcher, glaciologist (MSc 1994)
- Charles Kettering, electrical engineer; founder of Delco; Vice President of Research for General Motors; invented electric starter for automobiles; co-founder (with Alfred Sloan) of Sloan-Kettering Cancer Center in 1945 (B.S. 1904)
- Benjamin G. Lamme, engineer; longtime head of engineering at Westinghouse; pioneered the design of rotary converters; developed direct current railway motors; produced the first commercially successful induction motor (B.S. 1888)
- Robert Henry Lawrence Jr., first African-American NASA astronaut (Ph.D. Chemistry 1965)
- Richard M. Linnehan, astronaut (DVM 1985)
- Nigel Lockyer, director of Fermilab since 2013 (Ph.D. 1980)
- Ralph D. Mershon, engineer, inventor, and benefactor
- LeRoy H. Minton, ceramics engineer (E.M. 1905)
- John L. Moll, engineer, pioneer in the use of silicon transistors at Bell Labs, Stanford University and Hewlett-Packard (B.S. 1943, Ph.D. 1952)
- Russell C. Newhouse, engineer, pioneer in development of radio altimeter for aircraft, Bell Labs (B.S. EE 1929)
- Mark Ogan, ceramic engineer (E.M. 1903)
- Julie Palais, Antarctic researcher, glaciologist (M.S., Ph.D.)
- Roy Plunkett, inventor of teflon (Ph.D. 1936)
- Douglas Prasher, discoverer of green fluorescent protein (GFP) gene (Ph.D. 1979)
- Karl Probst, engineer, inventor of the Jeep (B.S. 1906)
- Larry Sanger, co-founder of Wikipedia (Ph.D., 2000)
- R. Tom Sawyer, inventor of the first successful gas turbine locomotive and assisted with the development of the diesel locomotive (B.S. 1923, M.S. 1930)
- Ronald M. Sega, astronaut (M.S. 1975)
- Robert Slocum, botanist and biologist (M.S. 1977)
- Thamotharam Somasekaram, Sri Lankan Tamil geographer, Surveyor General of Sri Lanka 1991–1992
- Esther S. Takeuchi, bioengineer; chief scientist at Greatbatch; inventor of the microbatteries that made implantable defibrillators possible (Ph.D.)
- Sidney van den Bergh, astronomer (M.S.)
- Quentin D. Wheeler, entomologist and taxonomist, president of ESF (B.S. 1976; M.S. 1977; Ph.D. 1980)

=== Sports ===
==== Olympic medalists ====
Over 200 Ohio State alumni have competed in the Olympic Games, including the following medalists:

- Dave Albritton, track and field 1936 Summer Olympics silver medal
- Miller Anderson, diving 1948 Summer Olympics silver medal; 1952 Helsinki Olympic Games silver medal
- Aldis Berzins, volleyball 1984 Summer Olympics gold medal
- Raj Bhavsar, gymnastics 2008 Summer Olympics bronze medal
- Tessa Bonhomme, Canada women's ice hockey 2010 Winter Olympics gold medal
- Juan Botella, Mexico, diving 1960 Summer Olympics bronze medal
- Nathan Brooks, boxing 1952 Summer Olympics gold medal
- Jennifer Chandler, diving 1976 Summer Olympics gold medal
- Lisa Chesson, women's ice hockey 2010 Winter Olympics silver medal
- Mary Ellen Clark, diving 1992 Summer Olympics bronze medal; 1996 Atlanta Olympic Games bronze medal
- Bob Clotworthy, diving 1952 Helsinki Olympic Games bronze medal; 1956 Melbourne Olympic Games gold medal
- Gerald Cole, track and field 1952 Helsinki Olympic Games silver medal
- Glenn Davis, track and field 1956 Melbourne Olympic Games gold medal; 1960 Rome Olympic Games two gold medals
- Diane Dixon, track and field 1984 Los Angeles Olympic Games gold and silver medal; 1988 Seoul Olympic Games silver medal
- James George, weightlifting 1956 Melbourne Olympic Games bronze medal; 1960 Rome Olympic Games silver medal
- Peter George, weightlifting 1948 London Olympic Games silver medal; 1952 Helsinki Olympic Games gold Medal; 1956 Melbourne Olympic Games silver medal
- Joe Greene, track and field 1992 Barcelona Olympic Games bronze medal; 1996 Atlanta Olympic Games bronze medal
- Sam Hall, diving 1960 Rome Olympic Games silver medal
- Morgan Hamm, gymnastics 2004 Athens Olympic Games silver medal
- Paul Hamm, gymnastics 2004 Athens Olympic Games gold medal, two silver medals
- Bruce Harlan, diving 1948 London Olympic Games gold medal, silver medal
- Donald Harper, diving 1956 Melbourne Olympic Games silver medal
- Bill Hosket Jr., basketball 1968 Summer Olympics gold medal
- Bill Hosket Sr., basketball Big Ten Conference championship in 1933
- Karen Josephson, synchronized swimming, 1988 Seoul Olympic Games silver medal; 1992 Barcelona Olympic Games gold medal
- Sarah Josephson, synchronized swimming1984 Los Angeles Olympic Games silver medal; 1988 Seoul Olympic Games silver medal; 1992 Barcelona Olympic Games gold medal
- Ryan Kesler, men's ice hockey, 2010 Vancouver Winter Olympics, silver medal
- Ford Hiroshi Konno, swimming 1952 Helsinki Olympic Games two gold medals, silver medal; 1956 Melbourne Olympic Games silver medal
- Emma Laaksonen, Finland women's hockey, 1998 Winter Olympics bronze medal; 2010 Winter Olympics bronze medal
- Jerry Lucas, basketball 1960 Rome Olympic Games gold medal
- Kelly McCormick, diving 1984 Los Angeles Olympic Games bronze medal; 1988 Seoul Olympic Games silver medal
- Jesse Owens, track and field, 1936 Berlin Olympic Games, four gold medals
- Yoshi Oyakawa, swimming 1952 Helsinki Olympic Games gold medal
- Jerry Page, boxing 1984 Los Angeles Olympic Games gold medal
- Lea Ann Parsley, skeleton, 2002 Winter Olympics silver medal
- Michael Redd, basketball 2008 Beijing Olympic Games gold medal
- Butch Reynolds, track and field 1988 Seoul Olympic Games gold medal, silver medal
- Jason Rodgers, Fencing, 2008 Summer Olympics silver medal
- Gordy Sheer, luge, 1998 Winter Olympics silver medal
- George Simpson, track and field, 1932 Los Angeles Olympic Games silver medal
- Bill Smith, swimming 1948 London Olympic Games two gold medals
- Katie Smith, WNBA player; basketball 2000 Summer Olympics gold medal; 2004 Athens Olympic Games gold medal; 2008 Beijing Olympic Games gold medal
- Natalie Spooner, Canada women's ice hockey 2014 Winter Olympics gold medal, 2018 Winter Olympics silver medal
- Jack Taylor, swimming 1952 Summer Olympics bronze medal
- Hanna Thompson, fencing 2008 Summer Olympics silver medal
- Minttu Tuominen, Finland women's ice hockey 2010 Winter Olympics bronze medal
- Bryan Volpenhein, rowing 2004 Summer Olympics gold medal; 2008 Summer Olympics bronze medal
- Marc Waldie, volleyball 1984 Los Angeles Olympic Games gold medal
- Malden Whitfield, track and field 1948 London Olympic Games two gold medals, bronze medal; 1952 Helsinki Olympic Games gold medal; silver medal
- Blaine Wilson, gymnastics 2004 Athens Olympic Games silver medal

==== Baseball ====
- Steve Arlin, MLB pitcher (1969–1974)
- Barry Bonnell, MLB outfielder (1977–1986)
- Chuck Brinkman, MLB catcher (1969–1974)
- Dave Burba, MLB pitcher (1990–2004)
- Galen Cisco, MLB pitcher (1961–1969)
- Rollin Cook, MLB pitcher (1915)
- John Dagenhard, MLB pitcher (1943)
- Mark Dempsey, MLB pitcher (1982)
- Johnny Edwards, MLB catcher
- Brad Goldberg, MLB pitcher
- Frank Howard, MLB outfielder
- Cory Luebke, MLB pitcher (2010–present)
- Jim Reeder, coach; California State University Hall of Fame Charter Member; namesake for the baseball field at California State University, Los Angeles (BS 1948)
- Moe Savransky (born 1929), MLB pitcher (1954)
- George Steinbrenner, New York Yankees owner
- Nick Swisher, MLB outfielder, World Series Champion 2009 New York Yankees

==== Basketball ====
- William Buford, former basketball player at Ohio State
- Mike Conley Jr., 4th overall selection in the 2007 NBA draft of the Memphis Grizzlies, NBA player for the Utah Jazz
- Daequan Cook (born 1987), basketball player in the Israeli Basketball Premier League, NBA player for the Houston Rockets
- Aaron Craft, professional basketball player for AS Monaco
- Jon Diebler (born 1988), basketball player in the Israel Basketball Premier League, player for the Panionios B.C.
- John Havlicek, NBA star (Boston Celtics), Basketball Hall of Fame
- Othello Hunter, NBA player for the Atlanta Hawks and in the Israeli Basketball Premier League
- Jim Jackson, former NBA player
- Chris Jent, former NBA player and Ohio State assistant coach
- Neil Johnston, NBA player and coach, Basketball Hall of Fame
- Roger Jorgensen, BAA player
- Clark Kellogg, former NBA player, TV sports analyst
- Bobby Knight, coach at United States Military Academy, Indiana University and Texas Tech University, Basketball Hall of Fame (B.A. 1962)
- Kosta Koufos, NBA player for the Sacramento Kings
- Ron Lewis, basketball player for Ironi Nahariya from the Israeli Super League
- Jerry Lucas (1958–1962), NBA star, Basketball Hall of Fame
- Mark Minor, former NBA player
- Kelsey Mitchell, first Team All-American, 2016, 2nd Team All-American, 2015, 2017, 2018, WNBA player for the Indiana Fever, selected 2nd overall
- B. J. Mullens, 24th draft pick in the 2009 NBA Draft (2008–2009)
- Greg Oden, first-team All-American, 2007, selected with the number one pick of the 2007 NBA Draft by the Portland Trail Blazers (2006–2007)
- Scoonie Penn, Euroleague player
- Evan Ravenel, free agent
- Michael Redd, NBA player for the Milwaukee Bucks (1997–2000)
- Arnie Risen, four-time NBA all-star, Basketball Hall of Fame
- LaQuinton Ross (born 1991), American basketball player for Hapoel Eilat of the Israeli Basketball Premier League
- D'Angelo Russell, 2nd overall pick in 2015 NBA draft by Los Angeles Lakers, NBA player for the Minnesota Timberwolves
- Brad Sellers, former NBA player
- Jacy Sheldon, WNBA player
- Jim Smith, former NBA player
- Lenzelle Smith Jr. (born 1991), basketball player in the Israel Basketball Premier League
- Jared Sullinger, former NBA player
- Fred R. Taylor, long-time former OSU head basketball coach, Basketball Hall of Fame
- Trevor Thompson, free agent
- Evan Turner, NCAA Player of the Year, former NBA player
- Bob Weltlich, former University of Texas coach, author of the novel Crooked Zebra
- Kaleb Wesson (born 1999), basketball player for Maccabi Rishon LeZion of the Israeli Basketball Premier League
- Herb Williams

==== Football ====
For a more complete list of Ohio State University alumni in the NFL, see: Buckeyes in the NFL

- Eli Apple, NFL cornerback for the New York Giants
- Brian Baschnagel, wide receiver for the Chicago Bears
- Joey Bosa, NFL defensive end for the Los Angeles Chargers
- Nick Bosa, NFL defensive end for the San Francisco 49ers
- Paul Brown, coach, member of the Pro Football Hall of Fame, and namesake of Cleveland Browns (M.A. 1940)
- Earle Bruce, College Football Hall of Fame coach (OSU coach 1979–87)
- Connie Carberg, first female NFL scout
- Cris Carter, former NFL wide receiver, Pro Football Hall of Fame member
- Howard "Hopalong" Cassady, Heisman Trophy winner 1955
- Frank Clair, Canadian Football Hall of Fame coach
- Joe Cooper, Calgary Stampeders player
- Tom Cousineau, former linebacker, Montreal Alouettes, Cleveland Browns first pick of the 1979 NFL Draft
- Ryan Day, Ohio State head coach (2019–present)
- Mike Doss, NFL safety for the Minnesota Vikings, three-time All-American
- Nate Ebner, NFL safety for the New England Patriots and rugby Olympian
- Byron Eby, football player
- Quinn Ewers, first student-athlete to make more than $1 million from endorsements
- Wes Fesler, three-time All-American end; coach
- John E. Frank, NFL tight end
- Jake Gaither, head coach at Florida A&M
- Eddie George, Heisman Trophy winner 1995, former NFL football player
- Sid Gillman, NFL coach and Pro Football Hall of Fame
- Ted Ginn Jr., NFL wide receiver for the Carolina Panthers
- Terry Glenn, NFL wide receiver for the Dallas Cowboys; 1995 Biletnikoff Award winner
- Anthony Gonzalez, NFL wide receiver
- Randy Gradishar, NFL linebacker, College Football Hall of Fame member
- Archie Griffin, only two-time Heisman Trophy winner (1974, 1975); president of the Ohio State University Alumni Association
- Lou Groza, football kicker and Pro Football Hall of Famer, Lou Groza Award namesake
- Chic Harley, three-time All-American running back
- Dwayne Haskins, NFL quarterback for the Washington Redskins, 2018 Big Ten Offensive Player of the Year, 2019 Rose Bowl MVP
- A. J. Hawk, NFL linebacker for the Green Bay Packers, 2005 Lombardi Award recipient
- Woody Hayes, Ohio State football coach (1951–78) and educator (M.A.)
- Kirk Herbstreit, ESPN sports analyst and former OSU quarterback
- John Hicks, 1973 winner of Outland Trophy and Lombardi Award
- Les Horvath, Heisman Trophy winner 1943
- Vic Janowicz, Heisman Trophy winner 1950
- Pete Johnson, NFL running back
- Cardale Jones, NFL quarterback for the Los Angeles Chargers
- Dante Lavelli, Pro Football Hall of Fame inductee (1945)
- Dick LeBeau, Pittsburgh Steelers defensive coordinator Pro Football Hall of Fame inductee (2010)
- Dick Logan, NFL guard for the Green Bay Packers
- Nick Mangold, former NFL center for the New York Jets, 2-time pro bowler
- Terry McLaurin, NFL wide receiver for the Washington Redskins
- Urban Meyer, former Ohio State football coach (2012–18) (M.A. 1988)
- Braxton Miller, wide receiver for Houston Texans
- Mike Nugent, NFL placekicker for the Cincinnati Bengals
- Orlando Pace, NFL offensive lineman Chicago Bears; winner of 1995 Outland Trophy and the 1994 and 1995 Lombardi Award; first pick of the 1996 NFL Draft
- Jim Parker, offensive tackle for the Baltimore Colts and Pro Football Hall of Fame
- Dwight Peabody, NFL end
- Pete Perini, NFL fullback
- Terrelle Pryor, NFL wide receiver; drafted in the 3rd round of the 2011 NFL draft as a quarterback
- Ev Rowan, NFL end
- Steve Ruzich, NFL guard for the Green Bay Packers
- Glenn E. "Bo" Schembechler, former football coach of the Michigan Wolverines (Master's 1952)
- Tom Skladany, three-time All-American punter and former professional football player, Detroit Lions, Philadelphia Eagles
- Troy Smith, 2006 Heisman Trophy winner, former NFL Player
- Chris Spielman, former NFL linebacker with the Detroit Lions, Buffalo Bills and Cleveland Browns; 1987 Lombardi Award recipient
- Shawn Springs, NFL cornerback for the New England Patriots
- Jim Stillwagon, Canadian Football League player, 1970 winner of the Outland Trophy and Lombardi Award
- Don Sutherin, Canadian Football Hall of Fame defensive back
- Jack Tatum, football player for the Oakland Raiders, author
- Paul Warfield, Pro Football Hall of Fame wide receiver
- Dan Wilkinson, NFL Defensive Lineman, first pick of the 1994 NFL draft
- Joe Williams, football player
- Bill Willis, Pro Football Hall of Famer; first African-American pro football player
- Antoine Winfield, NFL cornerback for the Minnesota Vikings; 1998 Jim Thorpe Award winner

==== Golf ====
- Ryan Armour, PGA Tour
- John Cook, PGA Champions Tour
- Bo Hoag, PGA Tour
- Rosie Jones, retired LPGA Tour
- Meg Mallon, retired LPGA Tour
- Jerry McGee, retired PGA and Champions Tour
- Gary Nicklaus, professional golfer
- Jack Nicklaus, retired professional golfer, holds the record for most Major Championships (18)
- Joey Sindelar, PGA Champions Tour
- Chris Smith, former PGA Tour
- Rod Spittle, former PGA Champions Tour
- Tom Weiskopf, retired PGA and Champions Tour

==== Handball ====
- Bryant Johnson, Olympic handballer and Pan American Games bronze medalist

==== Hockey ====
- Tom Askey, retired goaltender for the Mighty Ducks of Anaheim and various European pro teams
- Mike Bales, NHL ice hockey goalie, played for the Straubing Tigers (DEL)
- Mathieu Beaudoin, NHL player with Phoenix Coyotes
- Sean Collins, NHL player for the New York Rangers
- Zac Dalpe, NHL player with the Rochester Americans (AHL)
- Ryan Dzingel, player with the Ottawa Senators
- Corey Elkins, player/left wing with HIFK (Liiga)
- Nate Guenin, NHL player with the Colorado Avalanche
- Ryan Kesler, NHL player with the Anaheim Ducks
- Tanner Laczynski, NHL player with the Philadelphia Flyers
- Jamie Macoun, longtime veteran defenceman in the NHL
- Jeff Madill, retired NHL player with the New Jersey Devils
- Bill McKenzie, retired NHL goaltender
- Éric Meloche, former professional player, Philadelphia Flyers and the Pittsburgh Penguins
- Rod Pelley, AHL hockey player
- Dave Steckel, player for the Norfolk Admirals (AHL)
- Tyson Strachan, NHL player/defenseman with the Buffalo Sabres
- R.J. Umberger, player/center in the NHL for the Philadelphia Flyers
- Jim Witherspoon, retired NHL player/defenseman with the Los Angeles Kings

==== Poker ====
- Mike Sexton, professional poker player; host of the World Poker Tour

==== Rowing ====
- Erden Eruç, first solo human-powered circumnavigator of the Earth, with multiple Guinness world records for ocean rowing

==== Shooting (pistol) ====
- Ada Korkhin (born 2004), Olympic pistol shooter
- James H. Snook, won two gold medals at the 1920 Summer Olympics at Antwerp; 1908 graduate from OSU College of Veterinary Medicine; also served on faculty; inventor of the "Snook hook" surgical instrument; executed in February 1930 for murder

==== Soccer ====
- Eric Brunner, Houston Dynamo
- Ray Burse, goalkeeper, Puerto Rico Islanders
- Roger Espinoza, Sporting Kansas City
- Dustin Kirby, Real Salt Lake
- Kyle Veris, LA Galaxy and top European clubs

==== Swimming ====
- Ernest W. Maglischo, swimming coach for 38 years, coach of the year, and author
- Jim Montrella, women's swim coach at Ohio State 1980–1997
- Keo Nakama, athlete; first person to verifiably swim an open water Hawaiian channel; OSU swimming record holder, 1943, 1944
- Tim Phillips, athlete; World Champion swimmer

==== Track and field ====
- Stephanie Hightower, president of USA Track & Field

==== Wrestling ====
- Mark Coleman, NCAA Champion wrestler (190 lbs); silver medalist at the 1991 FILA Wrestling World Championships; retired professional mixed martial artist; former UFC Light Heavyweight Champion; UFC Hall of Fame member
- Jim Jordan, assistant coach 1987-1995 (elected to Ohio congress in 1994, US congress in 2006)
- Lance Palmer, four-time Ohio State wrestling champ, four-time All-American wrestler; professional Mixed Martial Artist, former WSOF Champion
- Kevin Randleman, two-time NCAA Champion (1992 & 1993) and runner-up wrestler (1991); former UFC Heavyweight Champion
- Kyle Snyder, two-time NCAA Champion wrestler, World Champion, Olympic Champion
- Logan Stieber, five-time HS Champion wrestler, four-time NCAA Champion wrestler
- Richard Strauss, team doctor, committed suicide in 2005, age 67

=== Other alumni ===
- Jeffrey Dahmer, serial killer and cannibal (left after one quarter with a 0.45/4.00 GPA)
- Jerrie Mock, author, aviator, first woman to successfully fly solo around the world (B.S.)
- Brian Shaffer, undergraduate alumnus and medical student who disappeared from a Columbus bar in 2006

== Faculty ==
=== Arts, humanities, and social sciences ===
- Charles M. Atkinson, university distinguished professor of Music
- Kevin Boyle, National Book Award winner and Pulitzer Prize finalist for Arc of Justice: A Saga of Race, Civil Rights and Murder in the Jazz Age (History, 2004)
- Henri Cole, poetry, Guggenheim Fellowship, Pulitzer Prize finalist
- Charles Csuri, art and computer graphics, influential artist and scholar; father of digital art and computer animation (BFA 1946; MFA 1948)
- Edgar S. Furniss Jr., Mershon Professor of Political Science and the first director of the Mershon Center for International Security Studies, 1960–1966
- Tim Griffin, art history, former curator-in-chief of The Kitchen and editor-in-chief of ArtForum International
- Ann Hamilton, sculpture; 1993 MacArthur Fellow; 2008 Heinz Award recipient
- Trevon Logan, Hazel C. Youngberg Trustees Distinguished Professor in the Department of Economics
- Lea McGee, professor emeritus of early literacy
- Tony Mendoza, photography
- Bebe Miller, dance; Guggenheim Fellow; founder of Bebe Miller Dance Company (M.A. 1975)
- Koritha Mitchell, professor of African-American literature and author
- John Mueller, political science; Guggenheim Fellow; holds the Wayne Woodrow Hayes Chair in National Security Studies; winner of Georgetown University's Lepgold Prize for the best book on international relations for The Remnants of War
- Geoffrey Parker, Andreas Dorpalen Professor of history
- Anne Pruitt-Logan, professor of educational policy and leadership, first African-American woman full professor at the university
- Duane W. Roller, professor emeritus of Classics
- John C. Rule, professor of history, 1958–1995
- Thyrsa Frazier Svager, professor, 1954–1987; provost, 1987–1993
- Stephen V. Tracy, professor of Greek & Latin, 1971–2002; creator and first director of the Center for Epigraphic and Paleographic Studies
- William E. Warner, industrial art professor 1925–1967, founder of the graduate program in industrial arts
- Alexander Wendt, political science; Ralph D. Mershon Professor of International Security; named the third most influential scholar of international relations by Foreign Policy magazine
- E. J. Westlake, chair of Theatre, Film, and Media Arts, Fulbright scholar, winner of the Oregon Book Award, and former editor of Theatre Journal

=== College of Education and Human Ecology ===
- Ana-Paula Correia, Ted and Lois Cyphert Distinguished Professor

=== College of Veterinary Medicine ===
- Cynthia Carnes, academic administrator and professor
- James H. Snook, equine surgeon and professor

=== Math and physical sciences ===
- Paul R. Berger, electrical and computer engineering, award IEEE Fellow (2011), Outstanding Engineering Educator for the State of Ohio (2014) and Fulbright-Nokia Distinguished Chair in Information and Communications Technologies (2020)
- Bharat Bhushan, Ohio Eminent Scholar and the Howard D. Winbigler Professor, College of Engineering
- George Billman, physiology
- Charles Chidume, mathematician and university professor (1984 PhD)
- Jose B. Cruz Jr., electrical engineering
- Rick Freuler, professor and coordinator of the Fundamentals of Engineering for Honors program
- Avner Friedman, mathematics
- Harvey Friedman, mathematics and logic
- Russ Hille, chemist
- William J. Mitsch, environmental science, 2004 Stockholm Water Prize for wetlands research
- Leo Paquette, chemistry
- John P. Richard, chemist
- Lonnie G. Thompson, geology, Tyler Prize-winning glaciologist (M.S. 1971 Ph.D. 1976)
- Altaf Wani, radiology
- Kenneth G. Wilson, physics, 1982–2008, 1982 Nobel laureate in Physics (
- Terry Jean Wilson, geologist, Antarctic researcher
- David W. Wood, chemical and biomolecular engineering
- Xiaodong Zhang, computer science and engineering

=== Medicine ===
- Clara D. Bloomfield
- Carlo Croce, medicine and genetics
- Bernadine Healy, cardiology, former head of the National Institutes of Health and the American Red Cross, 1995–1999
- Maryam Lustberg, breast oncologist
- William Pease, medicine

=== School of Physical Activity and Educational Services ===
- Gwendolyn Cartledge, professor

== Presidents of the Ohio State University ==
The first president of Ohio Agricultural and Mechanical College is Edward Orton, Sr., who served from 1873 to 1881. During Orton's term, the university became Ohio State University in 1878. Karen A. Holbrook took office in 2002 and was the first female president. E. Gordon Gee is the only president who served two terms, serving from 1990 to 1998, and from 2007 to 2013. Michael V. Drake took office in 2014 and was the first African-American president of the university, before leaving in 2020 to become the president of the University of California. Kristina M. Johnson, previously the chancellor of the State University of New York, began her term as university president on August 24, 2020.
