= Larissa Nekhlyudov =

American general internist

- Born: 1969 (age 56–57) (Note: In 1997, Nekhlyudov was reported to be 28); Moscow, Russia
- Spouse: Peter Matthew Meyer (m. 1997)

Academic background
- Education: BS, Biology, Brandeis University; MD, 1995, Icahn School of Medicine at Mount Sinai; MPH, Harvard T.H. Chan School of Public Health

Larissa Nekhlyudov (born 1969) is an American general internist. She is a professor of medicine at Harvard Medical School, primary care physician at the Brigham and Women’s Hospital and Clinical Director of Internal Medicine for Cancer Survivors at the Dana–Farber Cancer Institute.

== Early life and education ==
Nekhlyudov was born in Moscow, Russia and immigrated to Brooklyn, New York. She attended Brandeis University where she met her future husband Peter Matthew Meyer, whom she married in 1997. Following her graduation, Nekhlyudov enrolled at Icahn School of Medicine at Mount Sinai for her medical degree and completed her residency in internal medicine at the Yale New Haven Hospital and the Yale Primary Care Residency Program. During her training, she served as chief resident at the Hospital of Saint Raphael before accepting a fellowship in the Harvard Medical School Fellowship Program and earning her Master's in Public Health from the Harvard T.H. Chan School of Public Health.

== Career ==
Nekhlyudov joined the non-profit Harvard Vanguard Medical Associates in 1999 as a primary care physician and appointed Instructor at the Department of Population Medicine at Harvard Medical School. In 2005, Nekhlyudov established the Cancer Research Interest Group within the Society of General Internal Medicine (SGIM). The aim of the group was to "provide an opportunity for SGIM members to meet others with interests in cancer-related research, exchange ideas for proposals, discuss potential funding sources, form research collaborations, and identify mentors." She later received the 2014 Saul Horowitz, Jr. Memorial Award from her alma mater, the Icahn School of Medicine at Mount Sinai, and was elected a Fellow of the American College of Physicians.

In 2013, Nekhlyudov served a member of the National Academy of Medicine (NAM, formerly the Institute of Medicine) panel on cancer care quality. She is also serving on the Executive Committee of the Cancer and Primary Care International Research Network, the Advisory Board of the Massachusetts Cancer Registry, and the Survivorship Work Group at the Massachusetts Comprehensive Cancer Prevention and Control Network. Over the past decade, she has also served as co-director of the Harvard Medical School/Dana-Farber Cancer Institute CME conference on cancer survivorship. In 2015, Nekhlyudov left the Harvard Vanguard Medical Associates to join the Brigham and Women's Hospital's primary care practice. At the beginning of 2018, Nekhlyudov was elected as the inaugural scholar to participate in the National Cancer Institute (NCI)/AcademyHealth Healthcare Delivery Research Visiting Scholars Program. Through the program, she worked on "improving the care of cancer survivors and the interplay between primary and oncologic care." She is also an associate editor for the peer-reviewed medical journal covering oncology nursing with respect to cancer survivors called Journal of Cancer Survivorship and co-editor of the UpToDate section.
