= William Pease =

William Pease may refer to:

- William Pease (professor), American professor of medicine
- William Harper Pease, American conchologist, shell collector and malacologist
- William Edwin Pease, English businessman and politician
- Billy Pease, English footballer
