= Freuler =

Freuler is a surname. Notable people with the surname include:

- Charles Freuler, Swiss rower
- John R. Freuler (1872–1958), American businessman
- Remo Freuler (born 1992), Swiss footballer
- Rick Freuler, American aerospace engineer
- Urs Freuler (born 1958), Swiss cyclist
