= Maryam Lustberg =

American breast oncologist

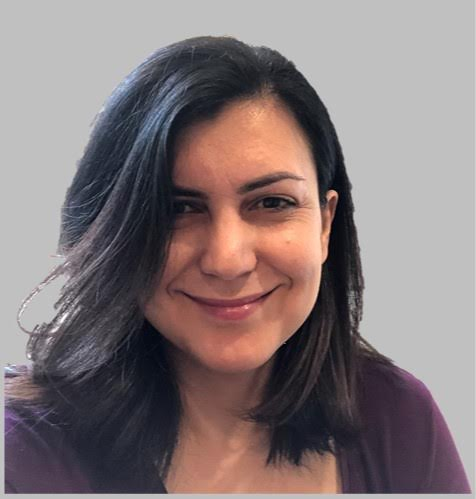
- Lustberg in 2020
- Born: Iran

Academic background
- Education: BS, biochemistry, University of Maryland; MD, 2003, University of Maryland School of Medicine

Academic work
- Institutions: Ohio State University; Yale Cancer Center

Maryam Beheshti Lustberg is an American breast oncologist. She is the Director of The Breast Center at Smilow Cancer Hospital and Chief of Breast Medical Oncology at Yale Cancer Center. Lustberg previously served as the Medical Director of Supportive Care at Ohio State's Comprehensive Cancer Center and President of the Multinational Association of Supportive Care in Cancer. She is also an associate editor for the peer-reviewed medical journal covering oncology nursing with respect to cancer survivors called Journal of Cancer Survivorship. Lustberg was also recognized as one of the 100 Influential Women in Oncology by OncoDaily.

== Early life and education ==
Lustberg was born in Iran but moved to Maryland with her family at the age of 10. She attended the University of Maryland for her undergraduate degree where she completed a double major in biochemistry and English. She eventually chose to pursue medicine after completing a research rotation at the NCI. From there, Lustberg earned her Medical Degree from the University of Maryland School of Medicine and completed her fellowship in Hematology/Oncology at the Ohio State University Wexner Medical Center. In the final year of her residency, she married her fiance and they were recruited to Ohio State University (OSU).

== Career ==
During her tenure at OSU, Lustberg has focused on researching "physicians’ and patients’ perspectives on cancer survivorship care, prevention of chemotherapy-induced peripheral neuropathy, and early detection of chemotherapy induced cardiotoxicity in breast cancer survivors". While working as a breast medical oncologist at The James Cancer Hospital in 2011, Lustberg was involved in a clinical trial aimed at finding a better way to assess early cardiac injury. The following year, she was part of a research team which used cardiac magnetic resonance imaging and heart health biomarkers in breast cancer patients to identify which patients were more likely to suffer from cardiac issues. She also received an Idea Grant from Pelotonia to fund her study on breast cancer patients’ chemotherapy-induced cognitive deficits. Using the grant, Lustberg and her research team investigated whether social isolation and feelings of loneliness could reduce a female cancer patients PTEN level, causing a cancer progression.

In 2017, Lustberg conducted a study which observed how chemotherapy treatment severely impacted patients' walking gait and balance, leading to a greater risk of falls. To reach this conclusion, her team followed 33 patients with stage I-III breast cancer through three months post-treatment. She was subsequently recognized by Forbes magazine as one of the United States' exemplary physicians in breast cancer oncology. The following year, Lustberg began studying the relationship between Omega-3 fatty acid and joint pain caused by cancer treatment. She has investigated whether Omega-3 fatty acids could be used as a preventive measure for joint pain rather than an intervention. Lustberg also received funding from the Alliance NCORP Research Base for her collaborative research project titled "Curcumin for Breast Cancer Survivors with Aromatase Inhibitor-induced Joint Arthropathy: A Randomized Double-blinded Controlled Pilot Study."

In 2020, Lustberg became the President Elect of the Multinational Association of Supportive Care in Cancer. She was also named by the magazine Columbus Monthly as one of the top doctors in central Ohio. Lustberg is also an associate editor for the peer-reviewed medical journal covering oncology nursing with respect to cancer survivors called Journal of Cancer Survivorship. The following year, she was appointed Director of The Breast Center at Smilow Cancer Hospital and Chief of Breast Medical Oncology at Yale Cancer Center.
