= Jessica Menold =

American mechanical engineer

Jessica Menold is an American mechanical engineer at Pennsylvania State University focusing on engineering design and prototyping. She is an associate professor of mechanical and industrial engineering, director of the Center for Immersive Experiences, director of the Technology and Human Research in Engineering Design Group, and the former holder of the Hartz Family Career Development Professorship in Engineering.

== Education and career ==
Menold was previously a student at Penn State, where she graduated with a bachelor's degree in mechanical engineering in 2013 and completed her Ph.D. in mechanical engineering in 2017, jointly supervised by Timothy W. Simpson and Kathryn Jablokow. While still a student, she also became a cofounder of a spinoff company, Amparo, focused on the design of prosthetics.

After postdoctoral research at RWTH Aachen University in Germany, she returned to Penn State as an assistant professor in 2018. She held the Hartz Family Career Development Professorship in Engineering from 2021 to 2024.

== Recognition ==
Menold's student work on prosthetics at Amparo was one of three winning selections at the American Society of Mechanical Engineers (ASME) Innovation Showcase in 2016.

Menold was the 2021 recipient of Penn State's President’s Award for Engagement with Students. She became an Air Force Young Investigator in 2023, and was named by the National Academies of Sciences, Engineering, and Medicine to their New Voices in Science, Engineering and Medicine program in 2024. She was elected as an ASME Fellow in 2025.
