= David W. Wood =

American chemical engineer

- Education: California Institute of Technology (B.S.); Rensselaer Polytechnic Institute (M.S.; Ph.D.)
- Scientific career
- Institutions: Ohio State University, Princeton University, Amgen, Bristol Myers Squibb, CP Kelco
- Thesis: Generation and application of a self-cleaving protein linker for use in single-step affinity fusion based protein purification (2000)
- Doctoral advisors: Georges Belfort, Marlene Belfort
- Website: https://cbe.osu.edu/wood-laboratory-applied-protein-engineering

David W. Wood (born in 1967) is an American chemical engineer who is professor of chemical and biomolecular engineering at Ohio State University. Wood is also associated with the Department of Chemistry and Biochemistry and Molecular Biophysics Training Program.

Wood is best known for his work on self-removing affinity tag methods, which he first published in Nature Biotechnology while a Ph.D. student at Rensselaer Polytechnic Institute. This method was also patented as a part of a collaboration with co-inventors at the Wadsworth Center of the New York State Department of Health and Rensselaer Polytechnic Institute, including Marlene Belfort, Georges Belfort, Victoria Derbyshire, and Wei Wu.

== Early life and education ==
Wood received dual undergraduate degrees in biology and chemical engineering from the California Institute of Technology in 1990. He worked as an undergraduate in the lab led by Frances H. Arnold. He earned his Ph.D. in chemical engineering from Rensselaer Polytechnic Institute in 2000. His doctoral co-advisors were Georges Belfort at Rensselaer Polytechnic Institute, and Marlene Belfort at Wadsworth Center.

== Career ==
After obtaining his undergraduate degrees, Wood started working on high-viscosity mucopolysaccharide fermentation development at CP Kelco in San Diego, California. Soon after, he joined Amgen in 1991, the same year that Amgen received FDA approval for Neupogen. This recombinant protein cytokine drug induces white blood cell production to fight infections in immunocompromised cancer patients after undergoing chemotherapy or radiation treatment. Wood worked on the GMP fermentation team to manufacture Neupogen (rhG-CSF) between 1991 and 1993. Neupogen became one of the most successful biotech drugs at that time and second blockbuster for Amgen after Epogen.

In 1993, Wood joined the group of Georges Belfort as a Ph.D. student at Rensselaer Polytechnic Institute, where he worked primarily on mini-intein development for protein purification. During this time, he engineered the ∆I-CM intein, which was derived from Mycobacterium tuberculosis recA intein. After earning his Ph.D. he joined a team at Bristol Myers Squibb in Hopewell, New Jersey. This time he focused on the recovery and in vitro processing of transgenic monoclonal antibody therapeutics.

In 2001, Wood started his academic career at Princeton University as an assistant professor of chemical and biological engineering, where he continued his research focusing on self-removing tags, protein engineering, and applied biosensors. In 2009, he joined the Chemical and Biomolecular Engineering Department at Ohio State University as an associate professor and soon after was appointed as a full professor. While at the Ohio State, he continued to explore additional applications, including the development of multitarget sRNAs that can be used for metabolic engineering, and the modification of human butyrylcholinesterase for the degradation of the chemical warfare nerve agents in collaboration with the Battelle Memorial Institute.

Wood has joint appointments with Department of Chemistry and Biochemistry and the Molecular Biophysics Training Program at the Ohio State University. He is one of a small group of researchers worldwide focusing on intein implementation in various applications, along with Belfort and Tom Muir.

Wood's research focuses on developing new technologies by recombining protein domains, particularly in biopharmaceutical development and manufacturing. He has continued refining these methods for biopharmaceutical development and manufacturing, and his work has drawn funding from the DARPA BioMOD project, NIH, NSF and US Army Research Office, projects as well as several industry sponsors. Wood was also involved in the development of protein switches for biotechnology funded by the NSF Career Award. Wood is an author of over 60 publications, six issued patents, two additional patent applications pending and an additional dozen book chapters or edited volumes. His publications have been cited nearly 4000 times.

Wood is a member of the American Chemical Society, BIOT division, American Institute of Chemical Engineers, and International Society of Pharmaceutical Engineers.

=== Awards and honors ===
- 2003: NSF Career Award
- 2016: Lumley Engineering Research Award, Ohio State College of Engineering

=== Business ===
Protein Capture Science is a biotech start-up company commercializing a self-removing affinity tag technology for research and large-scale purifications of proteins. Wood and Izabela Gierach are co-founders of the company, based in Columbus, Ohio. The first line of the iCapTag products for protein purification was showcased in the Industry Innovators 2021-2022 Issue of the journal BioProcess International. Protein Capture Science was recently awarded several grants and funding, including highly competitive The Ohio Third Frontier Technology Validation and Start-Up Fund and the Concept Fund for extraordinary technologies by the Department of Development, State of Ohio.
