= George Kohlrieser =

American psychologist (born 1944)

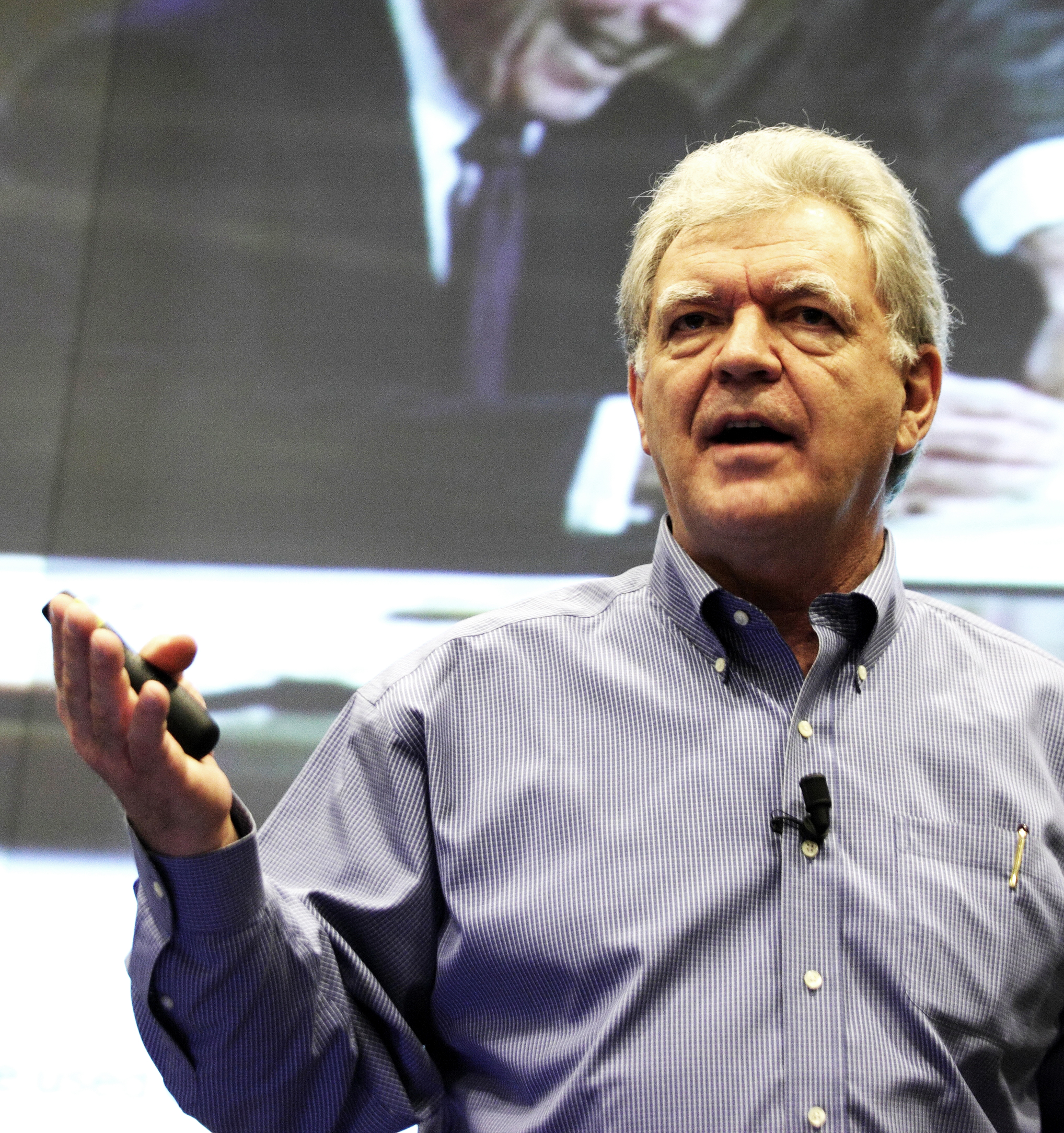
- Kohlrieser in 2012
- Born: November 26, 1944 (age 81); Wapakoneta, Ohio, United States
- Education: University of Dayton, Ohio State University
- Occupations: Psychologist, author, academic
- Website: georgekohlrieser.com

George A. Kohlrieser is an American-born clinical and organizational psychologist, author, speaker and consultant. He is Professor of Leadership and Organizational Behavior at the International Institute for Management Development (IMD) business school based in Lausanne Switzerland and the author of the award-winning book Hostage at the Table: How Leaders Can Overcome Conflict, Influence Others and Raise Performance (2006) and co-author of Care to Dare: Unleashing Astonishing Performance through Secure Base Leadership (2012). He is also known for his use of the hostage metaphor in business and leadership development.

== Early life and education ==
Kohlrieser was born on November 26, 1944, in Wapakoneta, Ohio. He entered a Catholic seminary at the age of 13 where he remained for eight years. He received a BA degree in Psychology and Philosophy from the University of Dayton and a doctorate from Ohio State University in 1988, where he wrote his dissertation on the cardiovascular recovery of law enforcement officers following high-stress situations.

== Career ==
From 1968 to 1992, Kohlrieser was Director of the Shiloah Center for Human Growth in Dayton, Ohio, specializing in individual, group and family therapy. In the same period, he worked as a hostage negotiator and police psychologist for the Dayton Police Department and the Montgomery Sheriff's Department. He also directed the police stress management and fitness for duty programs for the Dayton Police Department. From 1979 to 1989 he presented a call-in talk radio show "Matters of the Mind" on WAVI, WING and WHIO radio stations in Ohio.

Since 1998, Kohlrieser is Professor of Leadership and Organizational Behavior at the International Institute for Management Development (IMD), a non-profit business school in Lausanne, Switzerland. At IMD he is the creator and director of the school's High Performance Leadership (HPL) and Advanced High Performance Leadership (AHPL) programs for senior leaders. He is also Associate Clinical Professor of Psychology at Wright State University, Dayton, Ohio, and serves on the advisory board of the Neuroleadership Institute Advisory Board. He is a member of the Society of International Business Fellows (SIBF) and has served as the President of the International Transactional Analysis Association (ITAA). Kohlrieser served as a presenter and facilitator at the World Economic Forum on the Middle East, which was held in Sharm El Sheikh, Egypt in May 2006, and delivered a keynote address at the Zermatt Summit. Zermatt, Switzerland. He also gave a 2014 TEDx talk for TEDxFultonStreet on his experience in hostage negotiation.

== Research ==
In his work Kohlrieser draws on various scientific disciplines, such as attachment theory, brain science, cognitive science, social neuroscience and performance studies. He is best known for his use of the hostage metaphor applied to leadership development and for his secure-base leadership concept and its impact on high performance.

== Awards and recognition ==
Kohlrieser's book Hostage at the Table: How Leaders Can Overcome Conflict, Influence Others and Raise Performance received the Best Business Book Award 2007 from the Dirigeants Commerciaux de France (DCF), a French association of business leaders) and the "Best Management Book 2008" award from Managementbuch.de, the German business bookseller. Kohlrieser also received The BrandLaureate International Brand Personality Award in 2010 from the Asia Pacific Brands Foundation (APBF) for his contribution to the field of high-performance communication and the global European Case Clearing House (ECCH) Renewable and sustainable energy technology and development Hot Topic Case Award in 2011.

== Bibliography ==
- Hostage at the Table: How Leaders Can Overcome Conflict, Influence Others and Raise Performance (2006) ISBN 978-0-7879-8384-0
- Care to Dare: Unleashing Astonishing Potential Through Secure Base Leadership (2012) ISBN 978-1-1199-6157-4
