= Tahira Rehmatullah =

American businesswoman

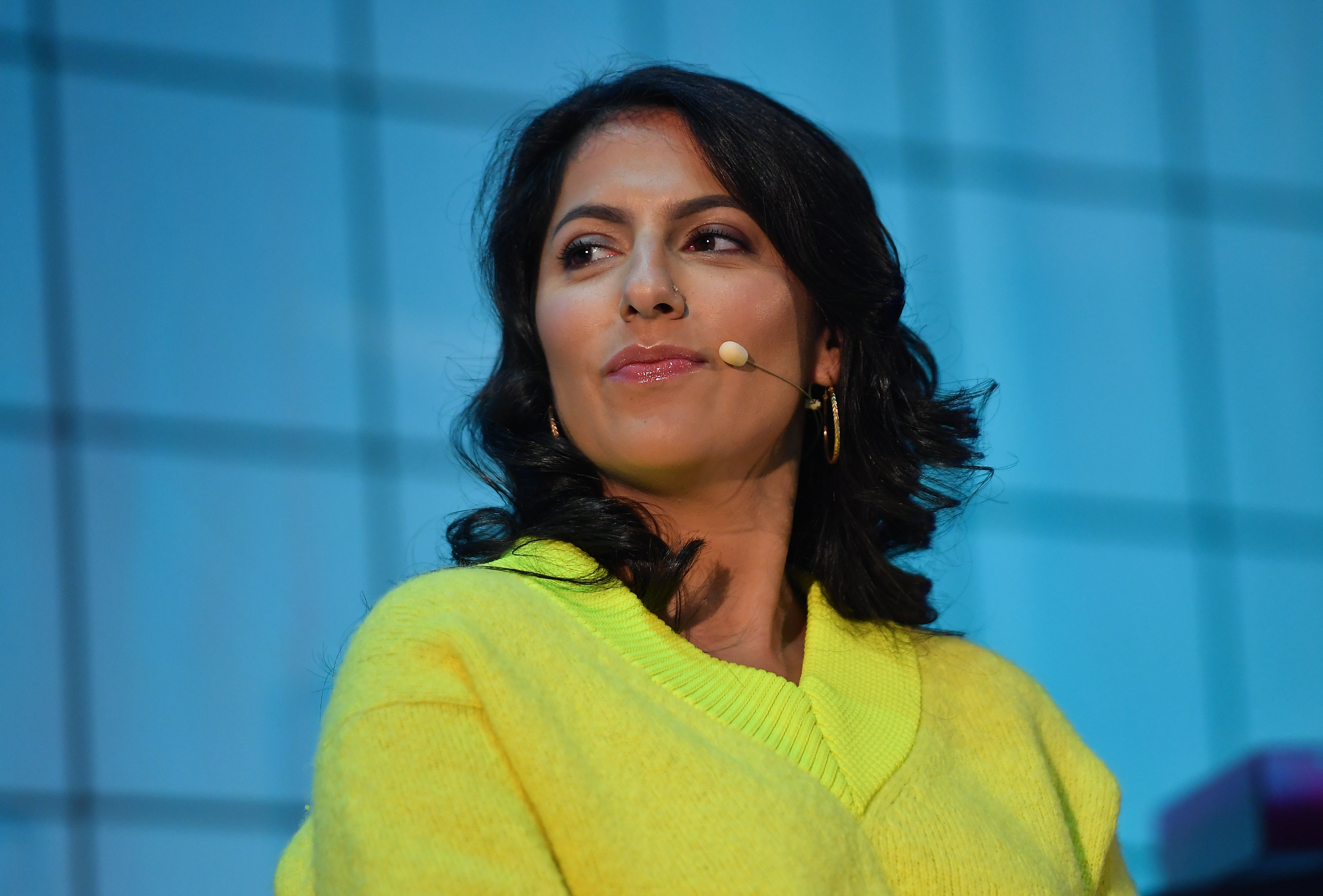
Tahira Rehmatullah

Tahira Rehmatullah is an American-Pakistani businesswoman and advocate for criminal justice reform in the United States. She is a partner at Highlands Venture Partners, co-founder and CEO of Commons and a member of the board of directors of the Last Prisoner Project. She was previously on the board of public companies Akerna Corp., Good Works Acquisition Corp., and Ceres Acquisition Corp., as well as private companies. Rehmatullah has become renowned since entering the cannabis scene in 2014. She is often referred to in the trade press as "the most powerful woman in cannabis" and her focus on equity and strategic growth have made her a standout public speaker.

== Early life and education ==
Rehmatullah was born in Ohio, where she grew up in a Muslim family of Pakistani descent. She received a B.S. in finance from Ohio State University and an MBA from Yale School of Management.

== Career ==
Advocating alongside organizations like the Last Prisoner Project, she strives to release the many Americans currently imprisoned under outdated cannabis laws. She is an advocate for underrepresented minorities and dedicated to developing female and minority leadership across industries. She launched and was the general manager of Marley Natural, named after reggae singer Bob Marley and an Investment Director at Privateer Holdings.

== Books ==
- 2023: Waiting to Inhale: Cannabis Legalization and the Fight for Racial Justice (with Akwasi Owusu-Bempah), The MIT Press, ISBN 9780262047685
