= Kathryn Jablokow =

American engineer

Kathryn W. Jablokow is an American engineer focused on engineering education, the engineering design process, and the cognitive psychology of engineering creativity. She is a professor of engineering design and mechanical engineering at the Penn State Great Valley School of Graduate Professional Studies, and a program director for engineering research initiation in the Division of Civil, Mechanical & Manufacturing Innovation of the National Science Foundation.

== Education and career ==
Jablokow is the youngest of three children of Herman R. Weed (1922–2022), a biomedical engineer and professor of electrical engineering at the Ohio State University; her mother was a teacher of German. She was educated in electrical engineering at Ohio State University, earning a bachelor's degree in 1983, master's degree in 1985, and Ph.D. in 1989. Her graduate research, involving the design of large machines that walk, was supervised by David E. Orin, and she also counts Robert E. Fenton as a faculty mentor.

She was a NSF-NATO Postdoctoral Fellow at RWTH Aachen University before returning to the US to join the Penn State faculty in 1990. Her doctoral students there have included Jessica Menold, who returned to Penn State to become a faculty member there. At Penn State Great Valley, she was associate chief academic officer from 2017 to 2020; she began a two-year term at the National Science Foundation in 2021.

== Recognition ==
In 2009, Jablokow was named an ASME Fellow. She was the 2016 winner of the Ruth and Joel Spira Outstanding Design Educator Award of the American Society of Mechanical Engineers.
