= Betty Schmoll =

Betty Lee Schmoll (née Begley; 13 April 1936 - 9 November 2015) was the founder of the hospice care company, Hospice of Dayton, which was one of the first hospice companies in the United States. Schmoll was also the first president of Hospice of Dayton.

== Early life ==
Schmoll was born in Cincinnati, Ohio to parents Bertha and Ezekiel Begley. She had two brothers, Robert and Jerry, and a sister, Barbara.

== Education and career ==
Schmoll received a Diploma in Nursing from Kettering College in 1970. She graduated from Wright State University, where she attended the Miami Valley College of Nursing and Health, with a Bachelor of Science in 1975. In 1978, she earned a Master of Science from the Ohio State University School of Nursing. She became passionate about end-of-life care from caring for her mother, who died from ovarian cancer. She recalled being disparaged by a doctor who told her that it was "ridiculous" she wanted to use her skills as a nurse to provide palliative care when she could save people's lives.

Schmoll gathered support from Dayton-area hospitals to create a hospice program; the Hospice of Dayton began in 1978, making it one of the first in the United States. At first, Hospice of Dayton operated out of St. Elizabeth Medical Center, with 13 inpatient beds, as well as at patient homes. Schmoll sought to expand the service, seeking donations from more than 14,000 individuals to create "Hospice House." Construction of Hospice House was finished in 1990, and a second structure on the same property was completed in 1996.

Schmoll served on the board of the National Hospice and Palliative Care Organization from 1991 to 1992.

== Awards and honors ==
Ohio's Hospice of Dayton created an endowed scholarship in honor of Schmoll and her colleague, Carol Dixon: the Betty Schmoll and Carol Dixon Endowed Scholarship for Leadership in Nursing. It is offered annually to each a graduate and undergraduate nursing student who demonstrates leadership skills. In 1981, the Dayton Daily News named Schmoll as one of their "Ten Top Women," which recognizes "women in the Miami Valley whose contributions helped make the area a better place to live." In 1998, she was awarded an honorary degree of Doctor of Humanities from the University of Dayton. In 2004, the National Hospice and Palliative Care Organization awarded her their Founders Award for being a "visionary, humanitarian and medical professional." In 2010, she was inducted to the Dayton Walk of Fame.

== Personal life ==
Betty Schmoll was married to Walter C. Schmoll; together they had five children. Schmoll enjoyed reading, birdwatching, and hiking.
