= Center for the Advancement of Women =

American research-based advocacy non-profit

- Formation: 1995; 31 years ago
- Founder: Faye Wattleton
- Type: Nonprofit organization
- Headquarters: New York City, United States

The Center for the Advancement of Women was a New York City nonprofit institution dedicated to research-based education and advocacy for women. In 1995 the organization was founded and led by Faye Wattleton, formerly the president of Planned Parenthood with the objective of working for the advancement of women. The organization conducted national opinion research among women to measure experiences in their daily lives. This research presented a profile of women that was used to educate opinion leaders, policy makers and the general public.

== Founding ==
The organization was founded as Center for Gender Equality in 1995. It was known as that name until 2002. Focused on research-based education and advocacy for women, the Center for Advancement of Women's mission was "to conduct national opinion research among women to measure experiences in their daily lives. This research presents a profile of women that [was hopefully] used to educate opinion leaders, policy makers and the general public."

== Projects ==
One of the significant research projects undertaken by the CFAW beginning in the late 1990s and lasting several years was "Progress and Perils: A New Agenda for Women," a landmark survey of over 3,000 American women that measured opinions on various topics, such as domestic abuse, sexual assault, affirmative action, and abortion rights. The responses were tabulated so as to reflect any differences based on race.

Other research projects included the Domestic Violence Report (an outgrowth to the "Progress and Perils" results), a National Security Report in response to 9/11, the Women on Religion Survey, and the Women in Science, Engineering and Technology Report.

== Closure ==
Throughout its fifteen years, the CFAW depended on donors, large and small, to do its work and, after years of financial struggle, the organization closed down.
