= Marlene Belfort =

American biochemist (born 1945)

- Born: 1945 (age 80–81)
- Education: University of Cape Town, University of California, Irvine
- Known for: Research on the factors that interrupt genes and proteins
- Awards: Alice C. Evans Award of the American Society for Microbiology; Mid-career Leadership Award of the American Society for Biochemistry and Molecular Biology; Lifetime Achievement in Science Award of the RNA Society
- Scientific career
- Fields: Biochemistry, microbiology
- Workplaces: Hebrew University of Jerusalem, Northwestern University, SUNY at Albany
- Thesis: Involvement of bacterial genotype in bacteriophage lambda's decision between lysogeny and lysis (1972)
- Doctoral advisor: Dan Wulff

Marlene Belfort (born 1945) is an American biochemist known for her research on the factors that interrupt genes and proteins. She is a fellow of the American Academy of Arts and Sciences and has been admitted to the United States National Academy of Sciences.

== Education and career ==
Belfort was one of the first undergraduate women to study microbiology at the University of Cape Town where she received her bachelor's degree in 1965 and an earned an honors degree in physiological chemistry in 1966. She went on to earn her Ph.D. from the University of California, Irvine in 1972 and did postdoctoral research at the Hebrew University, Jerusalem and Northwestern University. As of 2021, she is a Distinguished Professor in the Departments of Biological Sciences and Biomedical Sciences at SUNY at Albany and the RNA Institute.

== Research ==
Belfort's early research was on a gene involved in thymidylate synthase in the bacteria Escherichia coli. and its T4 phage. She subsequently found a bacterial structural gene in this virus, which was the first example of a intron-containing prokaryotic structural gene. Prior to her research, this junk DNA was only known to occur in more complex organisms. Her research then determined that the gene of the T4 phage was processed by RNA in a mechanism known as splicing and was excised from the transcript during processing in the cell, and led to the observation that the processing of the T4 phage RNA is similar to the splicing pathway used by eukaryotes Her work subsequently showed that the introns move to different places within a bacterial genome and she was able to determine the mechanism guiding this movement of genetic material.

Her most recent research also includes self-cleaving inteins, which are protein-splicing elements. Because inteins are sometimes found in essential proteins, her group is exploring whether inhibitors of intein splicing could be used as anti-fungal drugs. Belfort has also collaborated with Joachim Frank, a 2017 Nobel Prize winner in chemistry, in studying three-dimensional images of group II introns. In May of 2025, Belfort released her new memoir, "Mommy, Can Boys Also be Doctors? A Message to Young Scientists and Other Humans", entailing her scientific career and personal life.

== Selected publications ==
- Lambowitz, Alan M.; Belfort, Marlene (1993-06-01). "Introns as mobile genetic elements". Annual Review of Biochemistry. 62 (1): 587–622. doi:10.1146/annurev.bi.62.070193.003103. ISSN 0066-4154. PMID 8352597.
- Belfort, M (1997-09-01). "Homing endonucleases: keeping the house in order". Nucleic Acids Research. 25 (17): 3379–3388. doi:10.1093/nar/25.17.3379. ISSN 1362-4962. PMC 146926. PMID 9254693.
- Roberts, R. J. (2003-04-01). "A nomenclature for restriction enzymes, DNA methyltransferases, homing endonucleases and their genes". Nucleic Acids Research. 31 (7): 1805–1812. doi:10.1093/nar/gkg274. PMC 152790. PMID 12654995.

== Awards ==
- Fellow, American Academy of Arts and Sciences (1994)
- Elected member, United States National Academy of Sciences (1999)
- Excellence in Research, University at Albany (2000)
- Alice C. Evans Award, American Society for Microbiology (2002)
- Distinguished Professor, State University of New York (2003)
- Doctor of Science (honoris causa), University of Cape Town (2019)
- Mid-career Leadership Award, American Society for Biochemistry and Molecular Biology (2022)
- 2023 RNA Society Lifetime Achievement in Science Award (2023)

== Personal life ==
In 1967 Belfort married Georges Belfort. Between 1970 and 1976 the Belfort's welcomed three sons. In her spare time she enjoys writing and knitting.
