= Therese Zink =

American family physician, academic & author

- Occupations: General practitioner, academic and author

Academic background
- Education: Marquette University; Ohio State University; University of Minnesota

Academic work
- Institutions: Brown University
- Website: theresezink.com

Therese Zink is an American family physician, academic and author. She is a clinical professor in the Alpert Medical School at Brown University.

Zink is most known for using qualitative and mixed methods in research areas such as intimate partner violence, rural medical education, primary care guideline implementation, and medical professionalism. Among her published works are her publications in academic journals, including Annals of Family Medicine, Journal of Pediatric and Adolescent Gynecology, Journal of Interpersonal Violence and The Journal of the American Medical Association as well as books such as The Country Doctor Revisited: A Twenty-First Century Reader and COVID Chronicles: How Essential Workers Cope.

== Early life and education ==
Zink completed her B.A. in English and Theology from Marquette University in 1977. In 1985, she obtained her Doctor of Medicine degree from Ohio State University. She completed her Family Medicine residency in St. Paul Minnesota at the Ramsey (Regions) program in 1988. Furthermore, she earned a Master of Public Health Administration in 1992 from University of Minnesota.

== Career ==
From 1988 to 1993 Zink was the medical director at Family Tree Clinic, a community clinic in St. Paul Minnesota. After completing her MPH, she joined HealthPartners from 1994 to 1997 and served as the associate medical director at HealthPartners Institute. Appointed to the Minnesota Governor's Violence Prevention Task Force from 1996 to 1997, she co-chaired the practice guideline committee. As the co-chair of Physicians for a National Health Program (PNHP-MN), she worked with the Health Care Access Commission and lobbied to pass more comprehensive health care for all Minnesotans, which was called MinnesotaCare. Furthermore, she advised Minnesota Senator Paul Wellstone and his staff on health care reform during the efforts to pass national health care legislation in 1992.

In 1998 Zink joined the Department of Family Medicine, University of Cincinnati, initially as an assistant professor from 1998 to 2002, and then as an associate professor from 2002 to 2004. She also taught in the medical school and UC family medicine residency. Upon winning a Robert Wood Johnson Generalist Faculty Award for the term (2001–2005), she examined issues related to screening mothers for intimate partner violence when their children were present. Later, she joined the Sommers' team to examine injury related to sexual assault and risk-taking behaviors in vulnerable populations at risk for health outcomes disparities. She led a team that documented the dynamics of intimate partner violence in older women.

Zink returned to Minnesota and provided patient care and conducted research at the Olmsted Medical Center, where she was an investigator affiliated with Mayo Clinic, Rochester, Minnesota, from 2004 to 2006. As a professor, she served as associate director in the Rural Physician Associate Program and analyzed the outcome data of the 40-year-old program. In 2012, the Minnesota Governor's Health Reform Task Force examined health care in Minnesota, for which she chaired the rural workforce committee. She also founded the Global Family Medicine Pathway in 2010.

In 2014 Zink returned to Ohio to serve as chair of the Department of Family Medicine in the Boonshoft School of Medicine at Wright State University (WSU), serving through 2017.

=== Global health ===
Apart from her contributions to academia and public health, Zink has worked in global health. From 1997 to 2001, she was part of the Connect US/Russia program, participating in two six-week visits to work with communities in the former Soviet Union to address domestic violence. Between 2000 and 2001, she participated voluntarily in the Chechnya/Ingushetia Mission with Doctors Without Borders to help physicians improve their care of patients with adequate medications and supplies. She made trips to Honduras and Nicaragua with a medical team to improve cervical cancer screening for women. Since 2020, she has served as the education lead for the Foundation for Family Medicine in Palestine.

== Books ==
In 2010 Zink edited the book The Country Doctor Revisited: A Twenty-First Century Reader. The book explored the transformation of rural health care in the U.S. through essays, poems, and stories, focusing on the impact of technology, ethical dilemmas, and the experiences of health care professionals and patients in evolving rural settings. She garnered funding to support ten book discussion groups in medical schools across the U.S. She wrote the book Becoming a Doctor: Reflections by Minnesota Medical Students in 2012. Furthermore, her 2012 publication Confessions of a Sin Eater examined the emotional and ethical dimensions of doctoring through personal stories from her medical practice, highlighting the significance of empathy and storytelling in healing. In 2014, she introduced the Ann McLannly global health book series with Mission Rwanda. In this action-adventure novel, Ann, a family physician, found herself amidst the Rwandan genocide. In 2017, she authored Mission Chechnya. The book was another thriller about Ann McLannly, who, while working in war-torn Chechnya, became entangled in a crisis involving the kidnapping of her mission's director and the interplay of local and KGB forces. Later in 2021, she authored the book COVID Chronicles: How Essential Workers Cope. The book was a series of essays highlighting the struggles and resilience of essential workers during the COVID-19 pandemic.

== Research ==
As part of her research, Zink has authored papers, published in peer-reviewed academic journals across different themes, including intimate partner violence, rural medical education, healthcare technology, and the effects of global health challenges. Through her 1995 study, she examined the higher health care costs of female victims of intimate partner violence (IPV) compared to a general female population, finding that IPV victims incurred approximately 92% more in health care expenses. The study also reported that increased costs were primarily due to higher usage of mental health services, hospitalizations, and clinic visits, rather than emergency room services. In related research, her 2003 paper investigated how children influenced their mothers' decisions regarding intimate partner violence (IPV), focusing on how witnessing abuse affected children and how mothers weighed these effects when managing abusive relationships. It also explored mothers' desires for support from their children's physicians, including IPV screening, resources, and non-blaming education about the impact of IPV on their children.

While evaluating the outcomes of the forty-year-old Rural Physician Associate Program (RPAP), Zink's 2008 work found that 25% of the students, born in an urban or suburban area, who experienced rural practice for 9 months during their third year of medical school could be recruited to choose rural practice for their career. Another 2008 study focused on how the immersion experience in rural communities impacted medical students' learning and confidence, finding that RPAP provided valuable hands-on experience, one-on-one mentoring, and increased autonomy compared to metropolitan peers. A 2009 paper completed the work of William N. Friedrich, with the development of the sexual abuse severity score. The abuse characteristics of 156 CSA respondents were associated with self-reported trauma, somatization, and alcohol use. Characteristics included: age of first sexual abuse, more than one perpetrator, degree of coercion, severity of abuse (i.e. attempted intercourse is more severe than fondling), and the number of occurrences. This was one of the few reports to develop a risk summary that quantifies the severity of childhood sexual abuse. In her investigation of the challenges and motivators for small primary care practices in Minnesota regarding their participation in regional health information exchanges (HIEs), her 2010 paper highlighted the need for better leadership and financial incentives to achieve comprehensive integration.

Zink partnered with family physicians in the Occupied Territories of Palestine on research. In 2020 the team examined the stress levels of healthcare workers in Palestine during the COVID-19 pandemic. They identified key stressors, including the fear of virus transmission to family members and uncertainty about which vaccine would be provided through the World Health Organization COVAX program. The research also evaluated factors that impacted stress levels and potential coping strategies.

== Awards and honors ==
- 2012 – Distinguished Educator Award, National Rural Health Association
- 2013 – President's Award, Minnesota Academy of Family Physicians
- 2016 – Program of Excellence Award, American Academy of Family Physicians
- 2019 – Fulbright US Scholar Award for North Africa and Middle East Region, United States Department of State
- 2023 – Excellence Awards for Teaching, The Warren Alpert Medical School

== Bibliography ==
=== Books ===
- The Country Doctor Revisited: A Twenty-First Century Reader (2010) ISBN 9781606350614
- Becoming a Doctor: Reflections: By Minnesota Medical Students (2012) ISBN 9781477568668
- Confessions of a Sin Eater: A Doctor's Reflections (2012) ISBN 9781475109931
- Mission Rwanda (2014) ISBN 9780991265114
- Mission Chechnya (2017) ISBN 9780991265121
- COVID Chronicles: How Essential Workers Cope (2021) ISBN 9780991265169

=== Selected articles ===
- Wisner, C., Gilmer, T., Saltzman, L., & Zink, T. (1999). Intimate partner violence against women. Journal of Family Practice, 48(6), 439–443.
- Zink, T., Elder, N., & Jacobson, C. J. (2004). Medical management of intimate partner violence considering the stages of change: Precontemplation and contemplation. Annals of Family Medicine, 2(3), 231–239.
- Zink, T., Fisher, B. S., Regan, S., & Pabst, S. (2005). The prevalence and incidence of intimate partner violence in older women in primary care practices. Journal of General Internal Medicine, 20, 884–888.
- Fontaine, P., Ross, S. E., Zink, T., & Schilling, L. M. (2010). Systematic review of health information exchange in primary care practices. The Journal of the American Board of Family Medicine, 23(5), 655–670.
- Zink, T., Power, D. V., Olson, K., Harris, I. B., & Brooks, K. D. (2010). Qualitative differences between traditional and rural-longitudinal medical student OSCE performance. Family Medicine, 42(10), 707.
- Fisher, B. S., Zink, T., & Regan, S. L. (2011). Abuses against older women: Prevalence and health effects. Journal of Interpersonal Violence, 26(2), 254–268.
