= Margaret W. "Hap" Brennecke =

American metallurgist

- Born: 1911; Emmaus, Pennsylvania, U.S.
- Died: 2008 (aged 96–97)
- Education: Ohio State University B.S. Carnegie Institute of Technology; University of Pittsburgh; University of California, Los Angeles
- Occupation: Metallurgist

Margaret W. "Hap" Brennecke (1911 – 2008) was an American metallurgist and the first female welding engineer to work in the Materials and Processes Laboratory at NASA's Marshall Space Flight Center, where she contributed to the Saturn V rocket program.

== Early life and education ==
Brennecke was born in 1911 in Emmaus, Pennsylvania. She earned a chemistry degree from Ohio State University and later studied metallurgy at Carnegie Institute of Technology, University of Pittsburgh, and University of California, Los Angeles.

== Career ==
=== ALCOA ===
She worked for Aluminum Company of America (ALCOA) for 22 years as a research metallurgist, identifying materials for military vehicles and engineering projects used in World War II. "Over these years, Brennecke also embraced a love of travel, spending time in Russia in 1958 and taking trips aboard freighters traveling to and from bauxite mines on the Caribbean island of Trinidad", NASA History wrote in 2019.

To assist the World War II effort, Brennecke sharpened her focus from general chemistry and specialized in welding and alloy fabrication. As part of that work, she chose the alloys and joining methods used for aircraft, railroad equipment, bridges, pontoons, and landing craft, including those used during the Normandy invasion, known as Operation Overlord, on June 6, 1944. Like other women of the era, Brennecke experienced gender discrimination throughout her career, which inspired her to choose a neutral nickname ‘Hap’ to disguise her gender in written reports and other correspondence that was passed beyond the laboratory. She said the nickname was a "middle ground between the courtesy of the times and the informality of the NASA engineering team."

=== NASA ===
In 1961, Brennecke joined NASA's Marshall Space Flight Center, where she worked on the Saturn V program as a welding expert, contributing expertise focused on gas tungsten arc welding and metal inert gas welding processes. Brennecke's responsibilities included selecting materials and techniques for building space rockets, especially cryogenic fuel tanks. Later in her career, she played a similar role in choosing materials and techniques for Spacelab and booster rockets on the Space Shuttle program.

She was a member of the NASA committee that rewrote Military Handbook 5, "Metallic Materials and Elements for Aerospace Vehicle Structures", in 1974. Brennecke helped establish "the most authoritative source for aerospace metals and alloys data", NASA History wrote in 2019.

Brennecke's supervisor recommended her for an award from the Society of Women Engineers, citing her “outstanding accomplishments vital to the success and timeliness of the Saturn Space Vehicle and other NASA programs.”

== Death ==
Brennecke died in 2008.

== Publications ==
- Brennecke, M. W. (1978). Characterization of large 2219 aluminum alloy hand forgings for the space shuttle solid rocket booster (No. M-273).
- Brennecke, M. W. (1970). Thermal treatment and mechanical properties of aluminum-2021 (No. MFS-20559).
- Brennecke, M. W. (1969). Thermal treating studies on new aluminum alloy 2021 (No. NASA-TM-X-53847).
- Brennecke, M. W. (1965). Electron beam welded heavy gage aluminum alloy 2219.
