= Russ Hille =

American biochemist

- Born: Charles Russ Hille; November 15, 1951 (age 74)
- Education: Texas Tech University; Rice University
- Occupation: Biochemist
- Children: 4

Charles Russ Hille (born November 15, 1951) is an American biochemist. He is a distinguished professor in the department of biochemistry at the University of California, Riverside.

Hille attended Texas Tech University, earning his BS degree in chemistry in 1974. He also attended Rice University, earning his PhD degree in biochemistry in 1979. After earning his degrees, he worked as a postdoctoral fellow at the University of Michigan until 1981.

Hille worked as a professor in the department of molecular and cellular biochemistry at Ohio State University from 1982 to 2007. During his years as a professor, in 2004, he was named a fellow of the American Association for the Advancement of Science.
