= John R. Halstead =

American educator and administrator

John R. Halstead (born February 17, 1948) is an American educator and administrator who served as the 25th president of Mansfield University of Pennsylvania and as the sixth president of the SUNY Brockport.

== Early life and education ==
Halstead was born in Cortland, New York. He was the younger of two children born to William E. Halstead and Kathryn H. Halstead. He attended local schools and graduated from Cortland High School in 1966 as class salutatorian. He was inducted into the Cortland High School Wall of Fame on April 28, 2018.

Halstead attended Colgate University, graduating in 1970 with a B.A. in sociology. He earned an M.A. from Michigan State University in 1972 and a Ph.D. from Ohio State University (1980), and pursued post-doctoral work at Harvard University’s Institute for Educational Management.

== Career ==
Halstead began his career as a student affairs administrator at Albion College (July 1972 – June 1973), followed by student affairs roles at Boston University (July 1973 – June 1974), the College of the Holy Cross (August 1974 – June 1977), and Ohio State University (July 1977 – July 1980).

In August 1980, Halstead became vice president for student life at Gonzaga University. He left Gonzaga in July 1987 to become vice president for student affairs at the University of Maine, the state’s land-grant university located in Orono.

In June 1998 Halstead left the University of Maine to become president of Mansfield University of Pennsylvania. Halstead assumed the university’s presidency in July 1998, succeeding Rod Kelchner. He initiated the “Mansfield Plan,” which established multi-year goals for increasing the university’s enrollment and diversity and strengthening its finances.

Halstead began his presidency of the College at Brockport in August 2005 and was formally inaugurated on April 7, 2006.

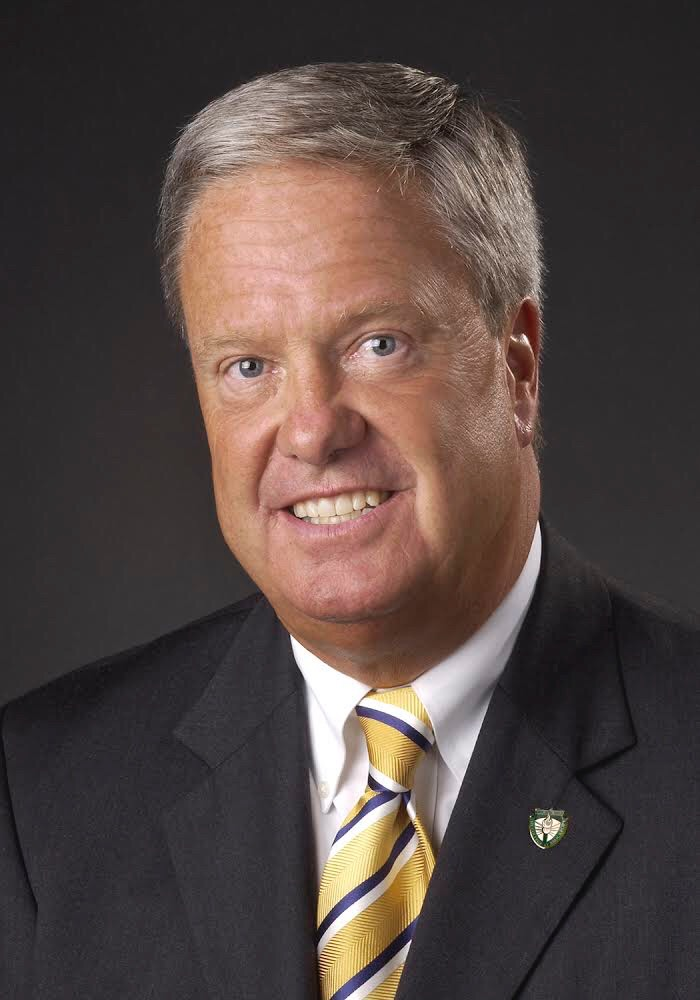
John R. Halstead (courtesy of SUNY Brockport)

During Halstead’s administration, the college launched plans for a new doctoral program in nursing and several green-campus initiatives. According to the Rochester Business Journal, "During his 10 years at the helm of SUNY College at Brockport, John Halstead oversaw a season of great change at the college—an expansion that included the construction of three new campus buildings [and] the launch of its first major capital campaign, which exceeded its $25 million goal more than a year ahead of schedule." Those new buildings included the $44 million Special Events Recreation Center, the $29.5 million Liberal Arts academic building, and the 52-unit, 208-bed Student Townhomes Complex.

On August 18, 2014, Halstead announced he would be retiring in August 2015 after completing his tenth year as the college’s president.

== Personal life ==
In 1971 Halstead met Kathleen Tilt while the two were students at Michigan State University. They married in 1973. They have one daughter.

The Halsteads established two scholarship endowments for SUNY Brockport students: the John R. and Kathleen A. Halstead Scholarship, which supports first-generation students; and the John R. Halstead Family Leadership in Higher Education Award, which recognizes an outstanding junior- or senior-level student who aspires to a career in student development or higher education. Halstead and his wife currently reside in Penn Yan, New York.

Academic offices
Preceded by John B. Clark (interim)	President of the State University of New York at Brockport; 2005 – 2015	Incumbent
