= Brian Otting =

- Born: Brian Frederick Otting; February 3 Cincinnati, Ohio
- Other names: Nar Williams
- Education: Ohio State University
- Occupation(s): Filmmaker, Musician, Street Photographer, TV Host
- Known for: Filmmaking

Brian Frederick Otting, formerly known as Nar Williams, is an American filmmaker.

== Early life ==
Otting was born and raised in Cincinnati, Ohio. He earned a degree in theatre from Ohio State University. He lives in Los Angeles.

== Career ==
Otting started his career as a stage and film actor under the name "Nar Williams". His first Hollywood role was as the Pizza Delivery Guy in the comedy film "Man of the House" (2005) with Tommy Lee Jones.

He was a writer and host of the television series Science of the Movies, which aired on the Science Channel, and is a production of Discovery Communications. He also story produced the television mini-series Alien Encounters for Science Channel. He has appeared as a film critic on Current TV's The Rotten Tomatoes Show and as a guest host on G4's Attack of the Show! During this time, Nar Williams was listed by Wired.com as one of the "Top 150 Geeky Media People on Twitter".

While hosting the TV series "Science of the Movies", he talked profusely about achieving "nerdvana" [a state at which science fiction and fantasy fans reach the ultimate state of their fandom of the genres.] "Nerdvana" was also the name of his podcast and daily blog.

Otting wrote and produced the movie news/comedy show NextMovie Daily for MTV Networks. He also produced The Yahoo Movie Show and TV in No Time for Yahoo, and CraveOnline's comedy web series Heads Up, which showcased movies, video games, and comic books through commentary and sketch comedy. Heads Up was honored in the Variety Show category by the 14th Annual Webby Awards.

Otting wrote and directed Fanboy Funhouse, a comedy series that followed the antics of an odd cast of characters including Saug, a dragon with a dark past; Lobie, a talking brain in a jar; Dugnot, a bitter alien janitor; and Nar, the resident fanboy. In an interview with Tubefilter, Otting said of Fanboy Funhouse: "Shows like The Mighty Boosh and Pee-wee's Playhouse are a big inspiration for me. There’s no shortage of geek culture news on the internet, so my goal was to present it in a wild and unpredictable way -– with a cast of crazy characters. And I’m pretty sure it’s the only talk show with a playground slide for the guests." The show was nominated for "Best Variety Show" by The International Academy of Web Television in 2012.
