= Barbara A. Given =

American oncologist

- Spouse: Bill Given

Academic background
- Education: BSN, 1964, MSN, 1965, Ohio State University; PhD, 1976, Michigan State University

Barbara A. Given is an American oncologist.

== Early life and education ==
Given completed both her BSN and MSN at Ohio State University before enrolling at Michigan State University for her Ph.D. in Administration and Higher Education.

== Career ==
Upon completing her formal education, Given with her husband Bill joined the faculty at Michigan State University (MSU) in 1966. During her early years at MSU, she created the Caregiver Burden Instrument, an instrument that has been translated into Dutch, German, Japanese, Chinese, Tai, Spanish, and Hebrew. Following the 2000–01 academic year, Given was appointed to the rank of University Distinguished Professor. She was later the recipient of two awards; the International Sigma Theta Tau Elizabeth McWilliams Miller Award and Friends of the National Institute of Nursing Research (NINR) Pathfinder Distinguished Researcher Award.

In 2015, Given was elected Chair of the Sparrow Health System and Sparrow Hospital Board after serving as Vice Chair from 2012 to 2014. She was later inducted as a Fellow in the American Psychosocial Oncology Society.
