= Ralph Compton (electrical engineer) =

American electrical engineer

- Born: Ralph Theodore Compton Jr. July 26, 1935 (age 91); St. Louis, Missouri, U.S.
- Education: Massachusetts Institute of Technology; Ohio State University
- Occupation: Electrical engineer

Ralph Theodore Compton Jr. (born July 26, 1935) is an American electrical engineer.

== Life and career ==
Compton was born in St. Louis, Missouri, the son of Ralph Theodore Compton Sr., an academic. He attended the Massachusetts Institute of Technology, earning his SB degree in 1958. He also attended Ohio State University, earning his MSc degree in 1961 and his PhD degree in electrical engineering in 1964.

Compton served as an associate professor in the department of electrical engineering at Ohio State University from 1965 to 1967, and worked as a postdoctoral fellow at the Technische Hochschule in Munich from 1967 to 1968. In 1983, his paper The Effect of Random Steering Vector Errors in the Applebaum Adaptive Array won the M. Barry Carlton Award, and in 1984, he was named a fellow of the Institute of Electrical and Electronics Engineers, "for contributions to adaptive array theory and use of adaptive arrays in communication systems".
