= Oliver McGee =

American academic (1957–2020)

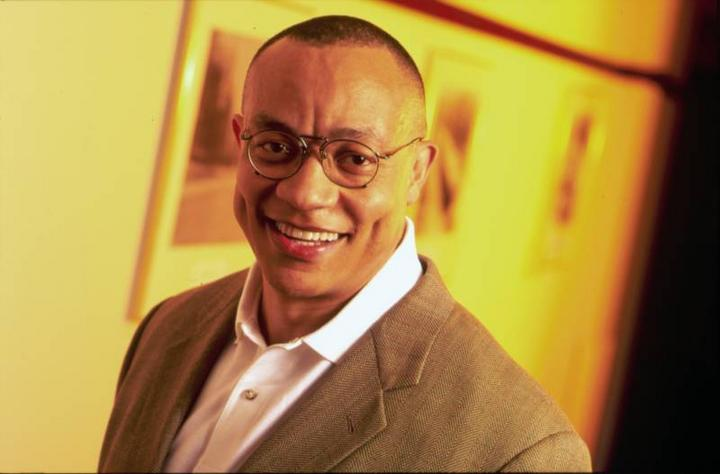
- Born: Oliver George McGee III; October 28, 1957; Cincinnati, Ohio, U.S.
- Died: June 7, 2020 (aged 62); Washington D.C., U.S.
- Education: Ohio State University; University of Arizona; University of Chicago
- Employer: Texas Tech University
- Political party: Republican
- Website: https://olivermcgee.org/about-dr-mcgee/

Oliver George McGee III (October 28, 1957 – June 7, 2020) was an American analyst, professor of engineering, and author. He wrote about his switch from being a Democrat to a Republican and about being a Republican in the "age of Obama" in his book Jumping the Aisle. He provided public advocacy on capital, technology, and U.S. competitiveness strategies for several political campaigns including Hillary for President 2008, McCain-Palin 2008, Romney-Ryan 2012, and Trump-Pence 2016 campaigns.

== Early life and education ==
Oliver was born on October 28, 1957. The oldest of four children to Oliver McGee Jr. and Jean McGee (née Arnold), in 1961, his father became the first African American to join the Cincinnati Fire Department. His parents divorced in 1970, with his father remarrying in 1988.

McGee graduated from Ohio State University with a bachelor's degree in civil engineering in 1981. He was the drum major for Ohio State University Marching Band. At the University of Arizona he received a Master of Science in civil engineering in 1983 and a Doctorate in engineering mechanics (with a minor in aerospace engineering) in 1988.

In 2004, he received a Master of Business Administration degree from the University of Chicago Booth School of Business.

== Career ==
McGee was a Professor and former Department Chair (2016–17) of Mechanical Engineering at Texas Tech University. He taught at Ohio State University, Georgia Tech, and was a visiting professor at MIT. He was formerly professor of mechanical engineering and former Vice President for Research and Compliance at Howard University, serving as the chief research officer. He was Senior Vice President for Academic Affairs for the United Negro College Fund (2006). McGee was a Professor and former Chair (2001–2005) of the Department of Civil & Environmental Engineering & Geodetic Science at Ohio State University.

McGee was the former United States Deputy Assistant Secretary of Transportation for Technology Policy (1999–2001) at the United States Department of Transportation and former Senior Policy Advisor (1997–1999) in the Office of Science and Technology Policy.

== Honors ==
- American Council on Education Fellow (2012–13)
- Certificate of Professional Development at The Wharton School (2001)
- Carnegie Foundation for the Advancement of Teaching State of Georgia Professor of the Year (1995)
- National Science Foundation Presidential Young Investigator Award (1991)

== Death ==
McGee died on Sunday, June 7, 2020, at the age of 62 years. In 2020, his niece mentioned in a GoFundMe memorial that his cause of death was stage 4 cancer.
