= Dan Masys =

American biotechnologist and academic

Daniel Richard Masys
- Born: 1949 (age 76–77); Columbus, Ohio
- Occupations: Biotechnologist and academic

Academic background
- Education: AB., Biochemistry; MD
- Alma mater: Princeton University; Ohio State University

Daniel Richard Masys is an American biotechnologist and academic. He is an Affiliate Professor of Biomedical and Health Informatics at the University of Washington.

Masys' research primarily focuses on creating and putting into operation biomedical research databases, especially those relevant to molecular biology, and on computer-based tools for biomedical research and healthcare delivery. He is the recipient of the Public Health Service Outstanding Service Medal from the NIH in 1993, the National Defense Medal from the U.S. Navy in 1974, the U.S. Navy Achievement Medal for computerization of clinical research activities in 1984, the 1986 NIH Director's Award for directing initiatives to improve dissemination of cancer research information, and the 1998 American Medical Informatics Association President's Award.

Masys is an elected member of the National Academy of Medicine, along with the Washington State Academy of Sciences, and an elected Fellow and former President of the American College of Medical Informatics. Additionally, he is a Diplomate of the American Board of Internal Medicine in Internal Medicine, Medical Oncology and Hematology.

== Education ==
Masys earned a bachelor's degree in Biochemistry from Princeton University in 1971, and received his Doctor of Medicine degree from Ohio State University College of Medicine in 1974. He completed postgraduate training in Internal Medicine, Hematology and Medical Oncology at the Naval Regional Medical Center, San Diego and the University of California, San Diego in 1980.

== Career ==
Masys served in the U.S. Navy Medical Corps from 1975 to 1984, then joined the National Institutes of Health (NIH) as a U.S. Public Health Service Commissioned Corps officer. At the NIH, he was appointed as a Computer Medical Specialist and later became Chief of International Cancer Research Data Bank Branch of the National Cancer Institute. Subsequently, he served as the Director of the Lister Hill National Center for Biomedical Communications, a computer research and development division of the National Library of Medicine. There he was the principal architect, from 1986 to 1988, of a program in biotechnology informatics that led to the creation of the National Center for Biotechnology Information (NCBI).

Upon retiring from the USPHS in 1994, Masys joined the University of California as Director of Biomedical Informatics and adjunct professor of Medicine until 2004. In 2005, he joined the Vanderbilt University School of Medicine as a professor of Medicine and also served as the Department Chair of Biomedical Informatics. He has been an Affiliate Professor of Biomedical and Health Informatics at the University of Washington since his retirement in 2011.

== Research ==
Masys has made contributions to the field of biomedicine through his research in biomedical informatics. His work involved establishing informatics infrastructure to support clinical and translational research, exploring the relationship between genomics and phenomics by utilizing phenotype data extracted from electronic medical records, and developing effective methods for integrating genomic data into clinical systems.

=== Biomedical informatics ===
Masys has worked in the academic discipline of biomedical informatics throughout his career. In 1996, he co-led the development of an online patient portal that gave individuals direct access to their electronic medical records. He worked on enhancing the security of health-related information communication on the internet by implementing the Patient-Centered Access to Secure Systems Online (PCASSO) project and providing secure access to clinical data for healthcare providers and patients using the Internet. He determined that the system effectively maintained security but was perceived as less usable by providers due to security features, while patients found it user-friendly and functional, emphasizing the need to balance security and usability.

At Vanderbilt, Masys and colleagues established a DNA biobank linked to electronic medical record (EMR) data, using an "opt-out" model, and this approach successfully accrued samples at a high rate and enabled correlation of DNA variations with phenotypic data collection based on EMRs. He also co-authored principles for the era of "Personalized Medicine" using individual molecular data like DNA and RNA requires specific changes in Electronic Health Records (EHRs) to efficiently manage and represent this data in healthcare settings. Moreover, he worked on training researchers in low-resource settings on the use of information and communication technology (ICT) tools for healthcare and research, and determined that hands-on skill-building activities and the inclusion of local examples in the training were highly valuable.

Masys led the first data coordination center of the eMERGE (electronic MEdical Records and GEnomics) Network, a consortium of five institutions exploring the integration of DNA repositories with Electronic Medical Record (EMR) systems to advance genomic research and has made progress in conducting genome-wide association studies on various health-related phenotypes.

=== Genome–phenome correlation ===
In a joint work, Masys developed a method for identifying genetic associations with diseases by scanning phenomic data using International Classification of Disease (ICD9) billing codes from electronic medical records (EMRs). The results demonstrated the feasibility of this approach by replicating four known SNP-disease associations and identifying 19 previously unknown statistical associations between SNPs and diseases. In related joint research, many prior genetic associations were replicated, and new potential connections between genetic variants and health conditions were identified, highlighting the utility of PheWAS in studying the genetic basis of diseases.

== Selected articles ==
- Masys, D., Baker, D., Butros, A., & Cowles, K. E. (2002). Giving patients access to their medical records via the internet: the PCASSO experience. Journal of the American Medical Informatics Association, 9(2), 181–191.
- Roden, D. M., Pulley, J. M., Basford, M. A., Bernard, G. R., Clayton, E. W., Balser, J. R., & Masys, D. R. (2008). Development of a large‐scale de‐identified DNA biobank to enable personalized medicine. Clinical Pharmacology & Therapeutics, 84(3), 362–369.
- Denny, J. C., Ritchie, M. D., Basford, M. A., Pulley, J. M., Bastarache, L., Brown-Gentry, K., ... & Crawford, D. C. (2010). PheWAS: demonstrating the feasibility of a phenome-wide scan to discover gene–disease associations. Bioinformatics, 26(9), 1205–1210.
- McCarty, C. A., Chisholm, R. L., Chute, C. G., Kullo, I. J., Jarvik, G. P., Larson, E. B., ... & eMERGE Team (2011). The eMERGE Network: a consortium of biorepositories linked to electronic medical records data for conducting genomic studies. BMC medical genomics, 4, 1–11.
- Denny, J. C., Bastarache, L., Ritchie, M. D., Carroll, R. J., Zink, R., Mosley, J. D., ... & Roden, D. M. (2013). Systematic comparison of phenome-wide association study of electronic medical record data and genome-wide association study data. Nature biotechnology, 31(12), 1102–1111.
- Masys, D. R., & Benson, D. A. (2022). Don Lindberg and the creation of the National Center for Biotechnology Information. Information Services & Use, 42(1), 107–115.
