= Lea McGee =

Lea M. McGee, a professor emeritus of early literacy at Ohio State University, was the Marie Clay Chair of Reading Recovery and Early Literacy. Her research interests include alphabet learning, the role of fingerpoint reading in making the transition from emergent to conventional reading, and young children's responses to literature.

== Biography ==
McGee was born on August 1, 1949, in Columbus, Ohio. She received her B.S. degree from Miami University in 1971 graduating summa cum laude. Later, McGee received her M.S. degree from Old Dominion University and her Ed. D. degree from Virginia Tech in 1980. She has taught at Louisiana State University, Boston College, the University of Alabama, and Ohio State University.

She teaches graduate courses in foundations of language and literacy development, Reading Recovery theory and practice, and emergent literacy research. Currently McGee is teaching the following courses at Ohio State University: Understanding the Reading Process, Reading Recovery, Understanding Reading Difficulties, and Research in Emergent Literacy. In addition to her work at Ohio State University, McGee frequently travels around the U.S. to provide professional development and personally work with teachers in their classrooms.

== Awards and grants ==
McGee was the President of the National Reading Conference in 2004. She also received the Albert J. Kingston Award for Distinguished Service at the National Reading Conference in 2000. While teaching at the University of Alabama, McGee received the Research Impact Award at the College of Education in 2006. McGee obtained two grants from the U.S. Department of Education. She was the principal investigator of the Early Reading First Grant, a two million-dollar grant that aids under-privileged children in high poverty areas. In 1994 McGee also received the Elva Knight Research Grant, an International Reading Association, for First Grader’s Response to Literature.

== Publications ==
She is the author of the following books: Transforming Literacy Practices in Preschools, Designing Early Literacy Programs and Literacy’s Beginnings (co-authored with Donald J. Richgels), Teaching Reading with Literature (co-authored with Gail E. Tompkins), Teaching Literacy in Kindergarten (co-authored with Mandel Morrow. She has also published numerous articles and book chapters in publications including The Reading Teacher, Language Arts, and Reading Research Quarterly.

== See also ==
- List of phonics programs
