= Faye Wattleton =

American activist

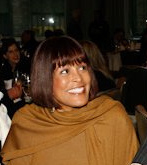
- 2009

President of Planned Parenthood
- In office 1978–1992

Personal details
- Born: Alyce Faye Wattleton; 8 July 1943 (age 83) St. Louis, Missouri, U.S.
- Education: Ohio State University (BA); Columbia University (MS)
- Occupation: Feminist activist Author and news commentator Registered nurse

Faye Wattleton (born Alyce Faye Wattleton; 8 July 1943) is an American reproductive rights activist who was the first African American and the youngest president ever elected of Planned Parenthood Federation of America, and the first woman since Margaret Sanger to hold the position. She is currently Co-founder & Director at EeroQ, a quantum computing company. She is best known for her contributions to family planning and reproductive health, and the reproductive rights movement.

== Early life and childhood ==
Wattleton was born in St. Louis, Missouri, in 1943, the only child of a construction worker father and a mother who was a seamstress and a Church of God minister. During her childhood, her mother's calling meant that the family traveled frequently, and Wattleton saw the emotional effect her mother's preaching had on congregation. For eight years Wattleton stayed with family members and friends while her parents traveled for work. Although her mother never approved of her work in reproductive rights, Wattleton considers the principle of nonjudgment espoused by the faith of her upbringing to have had a deep impact on her future work in family planning.

== Education and early career ==
Faye Wattleton attended Ohio State University at the age of 16. She was awarded a bachelor's degree in nursing in 1964, and went on to teach at a nursing school in Dayton, Ohio for two years. While in nursing school, Wattleton worked at the Children's Hospital in Columbus. There she cared for children who were abused, neglected, and sick with diseases.

Wattleton attended Columbia University in New York for post-graduate work on a full scholarship. Due to her interest in children born with drug addictions inherited from their using mothers, Wattleton did her master's thesis on phototoelectrophoresis, the medical term for the test used to screen pregnant mothers for drug use so that a baby can be treated for withdrawal immediately. Wattleton graduated from Columbia with her Master's of Science degree in maternal and infant care, with certification as a nurse-midwife, in 1967.

While working toward her master's degree, she interned at a hospital in Harlem. There, Wattleton saw female patients with life-threatening side effects of unsafe abortions. During her time at the hospital in Harlem she learned about many aspects of unwanted pregnancy. Approximately 6,500 women were admitted for complications from incomplete abortions during her time there. After graduating from Columbia, Wattleton accepted a position as deputy chief of the Dayton Ohio Health Department's visiting nurse association's maternal and child health programs. For two years she also served as the nursing instructor at the Miami Valley Hospital School of Nursing in Dayton

While working in Dayton facilities, Wattleton kept track of the numbers of mothers receiving prenatal care and realized that about 30 percent of them received none. Based on her view of neighborhood health clinics helping pregnant women in New York, Wattleton pushed for a similar system in Dayton. Her efforts were rewarded with the establishment of one such clinic where Wattleton and another nurse would treat patients for minor issues and refer them to participating area hospitals for major issues and for childbirth.

In Wattleton's role as midwife and deputy of visiting nurses in the Dayton Health Department, she saw many troubled women. The youngest girl that Wattleton cared for in her clinic was 13 years old. During her time in this position Wattleton thought about the societal consequences that pregnancy had on young mothers. The issue of teenage pregnancy troubled Wattleton and she began to work for women's reproductive rights. She joined the board of the local Planned Parenthood and shortly after, in 1970, Wattleton became the president of the Planned Parenthood of Dayton. The legal status of abortion was now on the political agenda. Wattleton accomplished a major victory for Dayton's Planned Parenthood when she began a successful initiative to provide teenagers with contraceptives without their parent's consent. In 1978, Faye Wattleton was appointed President of the Planned Parenthood Federation of America by its board, making her the first African American woman to lead the organization.

== Leadership of Planned Parenthood ==
Under her presidency at the Planned Parenthood Federation of America, from 1978 to 1992, the organization increased its range of health-care services and became more politically engaged. By the time she left the organization, it had more than 170 affiliates in 49 states and Washington, D.C., and operated more than 800 health centers. Faye Wattleton had two major goals upon becoming president: (1) improve women's reproductive health, and, (2) promote gender equality. Wattleton wanted to expand the focus of Planned Parenthood to emphasize abortion rights. Anticipating that the 1980s would bring many political challenges, Wattleton wanted the organization to be able to respond effectively to the new environment created by the election of Ronald Reagan and the rise of the Religious Right. Wattleton was among those spearheaded advocacy for the pro-choice movement during the decade. However, the movement faced fierce opposition. Planned Parenthood clinics across the country experienced shootings, bombings, fires, and some employees were killed or injured. As Wattleton's time at Planned Parenthood progressed, there was a major decision by the Supreme Court, Webster v. Reproductive Health Services (1989), in which the court held that states may withhold the use of public funds for abortions. At the same time, Wattleton was disappointed that about half of Planned Parenthood affiliates did not offer abortions. This, as well as other personal interests, led to her resignation as president in February 1992.

== Supreme Court rulings on abortion during Wattleton's advocacy ==
Faye Wattleton worked for reproductive rights at a time in America where the political tension surrounding the issue was mounting. In January 1973, the Court issued Roe v. Wade ruling that women had the right under the constitution to terminate their pregnancies. This was momentous and allowed for the creation of clinics where abortions could take place to rise in communities around the country. Three years later in Planned Parenthood v. Danforth, the Supreme Court rejected a lower court ruling that had upheld a Missouri law requiring, among other things, the consent of a women's husband for an abortion. In 1980, Harris v. McRae upheld the Hyde Amendment, ruling that patients receiving Medicaid could only receive Medicaid funds for an abortion if the pregnancy endangered their life. There weren't many cases fought on the U.S. Supreme Court level in the 1980s until Webster v. Reproductive Health Services in 1989, mentioned above, in which the Court ruled that a state could withhold the use of public funds and public facilities for abortions unless the woman's life was in danger. In Hodgson v. Minnesota(1990), the Court ruled that a state's parental notification requirement for minors seeking an abortion must be accompanied by a "judicial bypass" allowing minors to apply for an exemption in the courts. In Planned Parenthood v. Casey (1992), the Supreme Court ruled that states can make laws concerning certain requirements to get an abortion including waiting periods and counseling, as long as it does not enact an undue burden on the mother to receive an abortion.

== Post Planned Parenthood career ==
After leaving Planned Parenthood, Wattleton hosted a Chicago-based television talk show from 1992 to 1995. After the show ended, Wattleton began to give lectures across the country and created a non-profit think tank called the Center for Gender Equality, renamed the Center for the Advancement of Women in 2002. The purpose of this center was to "promote strategies for dismantling the obstacles that impede full equality for women". and to start a national conversation about the economic, political and educational aspects of women's everyday lives. The center closed in 2010 due to fundraising difficulties. In 2017, Wattleton Co-Founded EeroQ Quantum Computing with Nick Farina and Michigan State Professor Johannes Pollanen.

== Personal life ==
In 1970, Faye Wattleton's Parents moved to Texas where her mother preached at a small congregation outside of Houston. Wattleton was experiencing immense change in her occupational path as director of Planned Parenthood, Miami Valley when her father got lung cancer. By the time that she found out, he only had six months to live. He died that same year.

Also during this time, Wattleton's mother was struggling with the activism of her daughter. Her mother often told her that she was killing children and going against "God's word". Wattleton struggled to balance her faith and her activism. Her church stood at odds with pro-choice ideals. This would be a barrier in the relationship Wattleton held with her mother.

Faye Wattleton met her future husband, Franklin Gordon, in 1972. He was a jazz musician whom she had met at a conference sponsored by the Junior League. After the conference they parted, but Franklin wrote and mailed Faye poems. Wanting to have children, Wattleton married Gordon at the end of August in 1972. In January 1975, she learned that she was pregnant. She worked during her pregnancy by running for President of the National Executive Directors Council (NEDC) of Planned Parenthood's midwestern regional affiliates. On October 20, 1975, Wattleton gave birth to her daughter, Felicia Megan Gordon. Wattleton and Gordon divorced in 1981.

== Books and awards ==
In 1986, the American Humanist Association named her Humanist of the Year.

In 1992, Wattleton received the S. Roger Horchow Award for Greatest Public Service by a Private Citizen, an award given out annually by Jefferson Awards.

She was a 1993 inductee into the National Women's Hall of Fame.

In 1996, she published her autobiography, Life on the Line. Wattleton wanted to show people why she became an advocate for reproductive health. The book highlights important moments in her career.

Also in 1996, she received the Margaret Sanger Woman of Valor Award

She contributed the piece "Unfinished Agenda: Reproductive Rights" to the 2003 anthology Sisterhood Is Forever: The Women's Anthology for a New Millennium, edited by Robin Morgan.

In 2004, Wattleton won the Fries Prize for Improving Health.

Other awards that she received include: American Public Health Association's Award of Excellence; the Congressional Black Caucus Foundation Humanitarian Award; Independent Sector's John Gardner Award; and the Women's Honors in Public Service from the American Nurses Association.

Wattleton served on the Boards for Estée Lauder Companies, Quidel Corporation, Bio-Technology General, Yellowbox.com, Empire Blue Cross & Blue Shield, The Henry J. Kaiser Family Foundation, Institute for International Education and Jazz at Lincoln Center.

Wattleton has also received 15 honorary doctoral degrees.

== Sources ==
- "Wattleton, Faye" (2007). Encyclopædia Britannica Online. Retrieved 4 June 2007.
- Interview on Hillary Clinton and Obama on YouTube
