= Ana-Paula Correia =

Woman academic and scientist

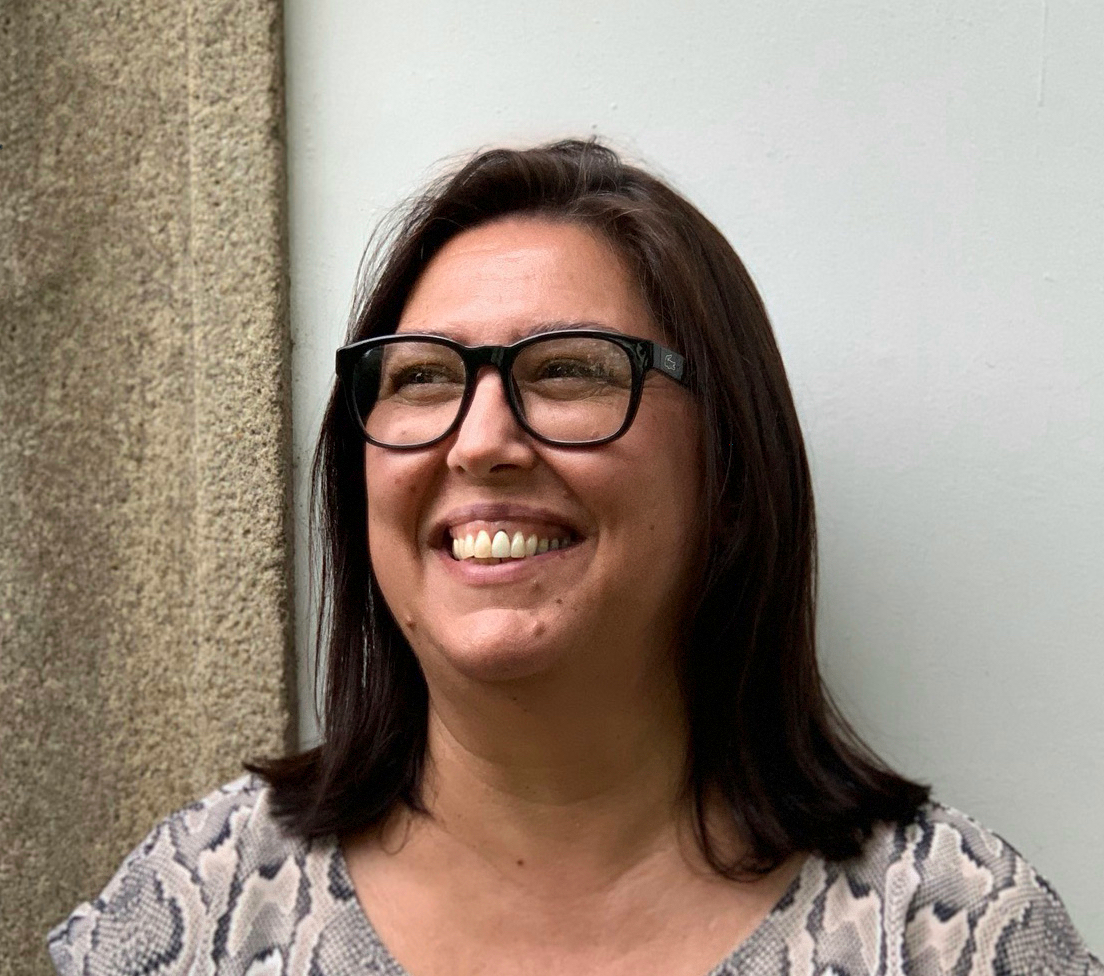
- Occupation: Professor of Learning Technologies

Academic background
- Education: Indiana University Bloomington (MSc, PhD)
- Thesis: Understanding conflict in teamwork: contributions of a technology-rich environment to conflict management (2005)

Academic work
- Discipline: Learning Design, Instructional Systems Technology, Human-Computer Interaction
- Institutions: Ohio State University; Iowa State University
- Website: https://www.ana-paulacorreia.com

Ana-Paula Correia is a professor of Learning Technologies and the Ted and Lois Cyphert Distinguished Professor in the College of Education and Human Ecology at The Ohio State University. She is known for her research on learning design, educational technology, and human-computer interaction, and her work on nomophobia.

== Biography ==
Correia received a B.S. from the University of Minho, Portugal in 1989 and a M.Sc. in 1996. She moved to the United States where she received her M.Sc. (2001) and her Ph.D. (2005) from Indiana University Bloomington.

Correia joined the faculty of the School of Education (formerly the College of Education and Human Sciences) at Iowa State University (2005). She subsequently moved to The Ohio State University (2016), where she serves as the Director of the Center on Education and Training for Employment.

== Research ==
Correia's research encompasses four interrelated foci: online learning and teaching, collaborative learning, human-computer interaction, and curriculum development in educational technology. These areas overlap significantly because they are connected to a central underlying theme in her research: learning design. She also conducts research in the field of artificial Intelligence.

Her research on nomophobia, fear of being away from one's smartphone, led to the development of the Nomophobia Questionnaire (NMP-Q). The questionnaire has been translated and used in similar research in Portugal, Turkey, Spain, Italy, China, Germany, France, and Pakistan.

== Honors and awards ==
Correia received the Best Book Chapter Award from the Association for Educational Communications and Technology (AECT) in 2023.

== Selected publications ==
- Baran, Evrim; Correia, Ana-Paula (2014). "A professional development framework for online teaching". TechTrends. 58 (5): 95–101. doi:10.1007/s11528-014-0791-0. ISSN 8756-3894.
- Yildirim, Caglar; Correia, Ana-Paula (2015-08-01). "Exploring the dimensions of nomophobia: Development and validation of a self-reported questionnaire". Computers in Human Behavior. 49: 130–137. doi:10.1016/j.chb.2015.02.059. ISSN 0747-5632.
- Yusop, Farrah Dina; Correia, Ana-Paula (2018). Teaching Online Simplified: A Quick Guide for Instructors (UM Press). The University of Malaya Press. ISBN 978-983-100-948-2.
- Correia, Ana-Paula; Liu, Chenxi; Xu, Fan (2020-10-01). "Evaluating videoconferencing systems for the quality of the educational experience". Distance Education. 41 (4): 429–452. doi:10.1080/01587919.2020.1821607. ISSN 0158-7919.
- Batsaikhan, B. (Zack), & Correia, A.-P. (2024). The effects of Generative Artificial Intelligence on Intelligent Tutoring Systems in higher education: A systematic review. Studies in Technology Enhanced Learning, 4(1). doi:10.21428/8c225f6e.33570bb1
