= William Pease (professor) =

William S. Pease is an American professor of medicine. He graduated from Vanderbilt University with a degree in engineering, and then attended and graduated from the University of Cincinnati College of Medicine followed by residency at Ohio State. He is currently the Ernest W. Johnson Professor and chair of physical medicine and rehabilitation at Ohio State University Medical Center. His published works include the texts Johnson's Practical Electromyography, 4th ed., 2007; and Physical Medicine and Rehabilitation: Principles and Practice, 4th ed., 2005 (both Lippincott). He serves as medical director of OSU's Dodd Hall Rehabilitation Hospital, consistently listed in the top 10 of USN&WR's best hospitals rankings.
