= Journal of Cancer Survivorship =

- Discipline: Oncology nursing
- Language: English
- Edited by: Michael Feuerstein

Publication details
- History: 2007-present
- Publisher: Springer Science+Business Media
- Frequency: Bimonthly
- Open access: Hybrid
- Impact factor: 4.442 (2020)

Standard abbreviations
- ISO 4: J. Cancer Surviv.

Indexing
- ISSN: 1932-2259 (print); 1932-2267 (web)
- LCCN: 2006214696
- OCLC no.: 70082316

Links
- Journal homepage; Online archive

The Journal of Cancer Survivorship is a bimonthly peer-reviewed medical journal covering oncology nursing with respect to cancer survivors. It was established in 2007 to improve knowledge and health care of cancer survivors and is published by Springer Science+Business Media. The editor-in-chief is Michael Feuerstein (Uniformed Services University of the Health Sciences). According to the Journal Citation Reports, the journal has a 2020 impact factor of 4.442.
