= Rick Freuler =

American professor

Dr. Richard J. Freuler is a professor and director of the Fundamentals of Engineering for Honors (FEH) program at the Ohio State University. As the director of FEH, he also teaches some of the classes.

He won the Charles E. MacQuigg Awards for Outstanding Teaching in 2000, 2004, 2008 and more recently in 2012.
