= Joanna McKittrick =

American engineer and professor (1954–2019)

- Born: 1954; New Jersey, U.S.
- Died: November 15, 2019 (aged 64–65); La Jolla, California, U.S.
- Occupations: Engineer, university professor
- Years active: 1988–2019
- Known for: Research on biomaterials and advocacy for underrepresented students in STEM

Joanna McKittrick (1954 – November 15, 2019) was an American engineer and college professor, the second woman to join the engineering faculty at the University of California, San Diego (UCSD).

== Early life ==
Joanna McKittrick was born in New Jersey, the daughter of John R. McKittrick and Estella Ruth Pederson McKittrick. Her father was a doctor and her mother was a teacher. She earned a bachelor's degree in mechanical engineering from the University of Colorado, Boulder, and a master's degree from Northwestern University. She completed doctoral studies at the Massachusetts Institute of Technology, in the field of materials science and engineering.

== Career ==
McKittrick was a professor in the engineering program at the University of California, San Diego, from 1988. She was the second woman to join the program (chemical engineer Jan B. Talbot was the first). McKittrick's research focused luminescent materials for medical, automotive, and aviation applications, and biomaterials such as chitin, keratin, and collagen. She worked with fellow UCSD professor Marc A. Meyers on biomaterials. "Mother Nature gives us templates," she explained in 2013, of her work studying spiders, seahorses, boxfish, and porcupines. "We are trying to understand them better so we can implement them in new materials."

McKittrick was a fellow of the American Ceramic Society. She wrote or co-wrote over a hundred academic journal articles, and was an editor of the Journal of the American Ceramic Society. McKittrick was a mentor for minority and women engineering students, including Lauren Rohwer and Olivia Graeve. She was faculty advisor of UCSD's student chapter of the National Society of Black Engineers.

== Personal life ==
McKittrick died in November 2019, aged 65 years, at her home in La Jolla, California. Her colleagues held a memorial at the 8th International Conference on Mechanics of Biomaterials and Tissues a month later.
