= Jincheng Du =

Jincheng Du is a materials scientist and academic whose work focuses on the computational and experimental study of glass, ceramic and amorphous materials. He is a University Distinguished Research Professor and chair of the Department of Materials Science and Engineering at the University of North Texas.

Du has been an editor of the Journal of the American Ceramic Society since 2020.

== Career ==
After completing his doctorate, Du worked as a postdoctoral research associate at the Pacific Northwest National Laboratory from 2004 to 2006 and later as a research associate at the University of Virginia.

Du joined the Department of Materials Science and Engineering at the University of North Texas as an assistant professor in 2007. He became an associate professor with tenure in 2012 and a professor in 2017. Between 2012 and 2019, he held administrative roles in the department's graduate program, including graduate program director and associate department chair.

Du was a Faculty Leadership Fellow of the UNT Provost Office from 2018 to 2019. In 2024, he served as interim associate dean for research in the College of Engineering, was appointed University Distinguished Research Professor, and became chair of the Department of Materials Science and Engineering.

His visiting appointments have included the University of Modena and Reggio Emilia in 2014, Meiji University in 2015, and the Federal University of São Carlos in 2020, where he was a Fulbright U.S. Scholar. In 2021, he was a Gordon S. Fulcher Sabbatical Fellow at Corning Inc.

== Honors ==
Du was elected a Fellow of the American Ceramic Society in 2020. In 2021, he was named a Gordon S. Fulcher Distinguished Scholar at Corning Inc. and elected a Fellow of ASM International. He was elected a Fellow of the American Association for the Advancement of Science in 2025 and received the Varshneya–Mauro–Jain Guru–Chela Travel Fund Award from the American Ceramic Society in 2026.

== Books ==
- Massobrio, Carlo; Du, Jincheng; Salmon, Philip S.; Bernasconi, Marco, eds. (2015). Molecular Dynamics Simulations of Disordered Materials: From Network Glasses to Phase-Change Memory Alloys. Springer Series in Materials Science. Vol. 215. Springer. ISBN 978-3-319-15674-3.
- Du, Jincheng; Cormack, Alastair N., eds. (2022). Atomistic Simulations of Glasses: Fundamentals and Applications. Wiley. ISBN 978-1-118-93906-2.
