= Mark Ogan =

American ceramic engineer (1874–1912)

- Born: October 12, 1874; Nelsonville, Ohio, U.S.
- Died: May 11, 1912 (aged 37); Seattle, Washington, U.S.
- Education: Ohio State University
- Occupation: Ceramic engineer
- Employer(s): Atlantic Terra Cotta Company M. E. Gregory Terra Cotta Co. St. Louis Terra Cotta Company; Carnegie Brick & Pottery Company Northern Clay Products Company

Mark Ogan (October 12, 1874 – May 11, 1912) was an American ceramic engineer. In the early days of the ceramic industry, Ogan conducted original research with numerous companies, including the Atlantic Terra Cotta Company and the Carnegie Brick & Pottery Company, and quickly rose to the top of the field. He was a co-founder of Beta Pi Kappa professional fraternity, later known as Keramos.

== Early life ==
Ogan was born on October 12, 1874, in Nelsonville, Ohio. His parents were Elizabeth (née Passmore) and John Ogan. He grew up in the Nelsonville area, until his family moved to McArthur, Ohio. He attended public schools in McArthur. He became an electrician for the electric light plant in McArthur for several years before 1901.

Ogan enrolled at Ohio State University in 1901 to take a clayworking short course. While there in 1902, he was a co-founder of Beta Pi Kappa professional fraternity, later known as Keramos. He was the fraternity's 2nd assistant master potter or secretary. He graduated from Ohio State with an Engineer of Mines degree in mining and ceramic engineering in 1903.

== Career ==
Ogan began working for the Atlantic Terra Cotta Company in Rocky Hill, New Jersey in 1903. In 1904, he resigned and became the foreman with the M. E. Gregory Terra Cotta Co. in Corning, New York. After six months, he became an estimator and chemist with the St. Louis Terra Cotta Company in St. Louis, Missouri. He stayed in that position from 1904 to around 1908.

Around 1908, Ogan left St. Louis to become the manager of the terracotta division of the Carnegie Brick & Pottery Company in Tesla, California. In 1911, he became a chemist and superintendent with the Northern Clay Products Company in Auburn, Washington.

He was a member of the American Ceramic Society. He was also a member and delegate of the Brickmakers Association. In the early era of ceramic industry, Ogan conducted original research and was quickly rising to the top of the field.

== Personal life ==
Ogan married Olive Stafford of Braymer, Missouri on April 19, 1906. She was a contralto, vocalist, music director, and teacher. They had one daughter, Elizabeth, who died two days after her birth in January 1911.

Ogan died on May 11, 1912, in a hospital in Seattle, Washington at the age of 37. He died from appendicitis that was not diagnosed and treated in time to save his life. He was buried in McArthur, Ohio.
