= Olivia Graeve =

American material science researcher

Olivia A. Graeve
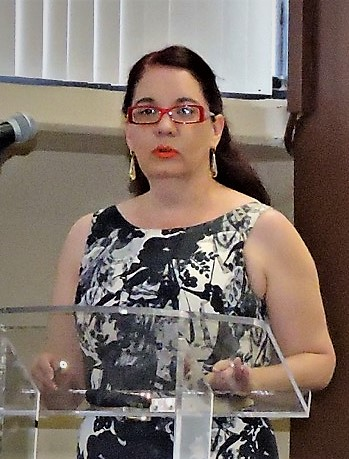
- Graeve speaks at the United States Consulate in Tijuana in 2016
- Born: Tijuana, Mexico
- Education: University of California, Davis, PhD, 2001; University of California, San Diego, BS, 1995
- Awards: Presidential Award for Excellence in Science, Mathematics, and Engineering Mentoring, Tijuana Walk of Fame Inductee
- Scientific career
- Workplaces: University of California, San Diego
- Website: graeve.ucsd.edu

Olivia Graeve is a mechanical and aerospace engineer and professor at University of California San Diego. She is also the director of the CaliBaja Center for Resilient Materials and Systems at UC San Diego – a binational research institute on both sides of the California-Mexico border.

== Education and career ==
Graeve was born and raised in Tijuana, the oldest of five children. She first attended Southwestern Community College for two years before transferring to the University of California San Diego, where she received her Bachelor of Science in structural engineering in 1995. There, she received mentorship from Joanna McKittrick, the second woman to join the engineering faculty at UC San Diego. She then received her doctoral degree in materials science and engineering from the University of California, Davis in 2001.

Following graduate school, she was hired as an assistant professor at the University of Nevada, Reno. In 2008, she moved to New York to become an associate professor at Alfred University from 2008 to 2012, before returning to University of California San Diego, as a professor in the Department of Mechanical and Aerospace Engineering within the Jacobs School of Engineering.

In 2024, Graeve was named the inaugural chair holder of the Elias Masry Endowed Chair in the Jacobs School of Engineering at University of California San Diego.

== Research ==
Graeve was the first Latina engineering professor to be hired at UC San Diego. Her research program centers on the design and processing of new materials that are fit for extreme environments, such as those experienced in outer space or in nuclear reactors. Among the materials her research group works on is a type of steel, called SAM2X5-630, with record-breaking resistance to deformations due to heavy impacts. The material has an unusual chemical structure that is elastic yet incredibly strong, making it potentially useful for applications like body armor and protective encasings for satellites.

In 2008 Graeve received an NSF STTR grant in cooperation with AMAD for her work on the development and research of tungsten and iron nanopowders, which have uses in the study of UV radiation filtering. Her focus on materials for extreme environments imbodies the study of materials that can withstand high temperatures, extreme strain rates, and radiation.

=== CaliBaja Center for Resilient Materials and Systems ===
Graeve currently serves as the director of the CaliBaja Center for Resilient Materials and Systems at UC San Diego. The center was established under Graeve's direction on May 24, 2016 as a collaboration between researchers at UC San Diego and National Autonomous University of Mexico. Faculty and students from both institutions work together to develop materials that can withstand extreme temperatures and pressures, leading to innovations in the development of jet turbines and nuclear reactors. In addition, the center is meant to advance the education and training of engineers who can work on both sides of the border.

== Recent publications [2025 - ==
1. del Carmen González-Apátiga, M., Ramírez-Acosta, A. Á., Graeve, O. A., & García-Vázquez, M. S. (2025). Comparative study of machine learning algorithms for the prediction of amorphous Fe-based materials. Applications of Machine Learning 2025, 13606, 120-129.
2. Espinosa-Cruz, E. J., Ramírez-Acosta, A. A., Stubbers, A., Thompson, G., Graeve, O. A., & García-Vázquez, M. S. (2025, September). Comparison of deep conditional generative models for scanning electron microscopy image reconstruction. In Optics and Photonics for Information Processing XIX (Vol. 13604, pp. 210-220). SPIE.
3. Solano-Castrejon, E., Ramírez-Acosta, A. Á., Durkee, S., Stubbers, A., Thompson, G., Weinberger, C., ... & García-Vázquez, M. S. (2025, September). CNN-based and optical flow-based image interpolation for TaC ceramics. In Optics and Photonics for Information Processing XIX (Vol. 13604, pp. 88-98). SPIE.
4. Huerta, V., Murillo, E., Chaikina, E., Graeve, O. A., & Herrera, M. (2025). Defect-Mediated Electrical Conduction and Piezoelectricity in Hydroxyapatite Nanofibers. The Journal of Physical Chemistry B, 129(33), 8428-8435.
5. Carrera, K., Huerta, V., Orozco, V., Matutes, J., Urbieta, A., Fernández, P., ... & Herrera, M. (2025). Formation of oxygen vacancies in Cr3+-doped hydroxyapatite nanofibers and their role in generating paramagnetism. Biomedical Materials & Devices, 3(1), 529-544.
6. F. J. Suarez, S. O. Santillán, R. Vazquez-Duhalt, O. A. Graeve, Enhanced Catalytic Stability of Laccase Immobilized on Copper Oxide Nanoparticles. ChemCatChem 2024, 17, e202401232.
7. Makale, M. T., Wrasidlo, W. J., Kesari, S., McKittrick, J., Flores, G. A. H., & Graeve, O. (2024). U.S. Patent No. 12,168,056. Washington, DC: U.S. Patent and Trademark Office.
8. Vargas-Consuelos, C. I., Vasquez, V. R., & Graeve, O. A. (2024). Electrospinning of LaB6/PEDOT: PSS/PEO Fiber Composites of Unique Morphologies. Langmuir, 40(47), 25229-25235.
9. Blair‐Loy, M., Mayorova, O. V., Hegazy, R., Graeve, O. A., & Cosman, P. C. (2024). Steering women out of engineering: Career assessment tools as a technology of self‐expressive segregation. Sociological Inquiry.
10. Yazdani, A., Dewitt, D., Huang, W., Borja‐Urby, R., Kisailus, D., Garay, J. E., & Graeve, O. A. (2024). Mechanical properties of an ultrahard in situ amorphous steel matrix composite. Advanced Engineering Materials, 26(11), 2400257.
11. Martinez-Pallares, F., Herrera, M., & Graeve, O. A. (2024). Decomposition of luminescent hydroxyapatite scaffolds in simulated body fluid. ACS Applied Bio Materials, 7(5), 3136-3142.
12. Novitskaya, E., Amachraa, M., Martínez-Pallares, F., Güell, F., Gómez-Vidales, V., Ong, S. P., ... & Graeve, O. A. (2024). Barium Vacancies as the Origin of Triboluminescence in Hexacelsian Ceramics: An Ab Initio and Experimental Investigation. ACS Applied Optical Materials, 2(4), 585-594.
13. Sanchez, M., Acord, K. A., Frueh, S., Rueschhoff, L. M., & Graeve, O. A. (2023). Phase transitions and oxidation behavior during oxyacetylene torch testing of TaC–HfC solid solutions. Advanced Engineering Materials, 25(18), 2300138.
14. Piñón-Muñiz, M. I., Ramos-Sánchez, V. H., Gutiérrez-Méndez, N., Pérez-Vega, S. B., Sacramento-Rivero, J. C., Vargas-Consuelos, C. I., ... & Salmerón, I. (2023). Potential use of Sotol bagasse (Dasylirion spp.) as a new biomass source for liquid biofuels production: comprehensive characterization and ABE fermentation. Renewable Energy, 212, 632-643.
15. Vargas-Consuelos, C. I., Camacho-López, M. A., Ramos-Sanchez, V. H., & Graeve, O. A. (2023). Phase and morphology control of hexagonal MoO3 crystals via Na+ interactions: a Raman spectroscopy study. The Journal of Physical Chemistry C, 127(27), 13136-13148.

== Outreach and public service ==
Graeve has been an advocate for bi-national collaboration between the U.S. and Mexico in science, technology, engineering, and mathematics (STEM) fields. She is the driving force behind the CaliBaja Education Consortium, which is a collaborative effort bringing together over 20 institutions in Baja California and UC San Diego. Faculty across these institutions collaborate on scientific research and education that serves students on both sides of the U.S.-Mexico border. For example, high school and college students can participate in a program called ENLACE, a seven-week program for students from both sides of the California-Mexico border.

In response to Graeve's work as the director of the CaliBaja Education Consortium and her acceptance of the Presidential Award for Excellence in Science, Mathematics and Engineering Mentoring from the White House. Graeve's stated "As I build programs for students, I am filled with hope that we can build something extraordinary, with kindness, compassion and respect for others... I hope that we will eliminate borders and bring down walls."

Graeve's has also been celebrated for her work as the director of the IDEA Engineering Student Center at the Jacobs School of Engineering where she continues her binational research opportunities for high school and college students across the U.S–Mexico border. She also works with the Society of Hispanic Professional Engineers (SHPE) to support and create opportunities for Hispanic students and faculty.

== Awards and honors ==
- 100 Most Powerful Women of Mexico, Forbes, 2017
- Fellow, American Ceramic Society, 2017
- Member, Mexican Academy of Engineering, 2016
- Member, Mexican Academy of Sciences], 2020
- Tijuana Walk of Fame Inductee, 2014
- Jaime Oaxaca Award, Society of Hispanic Professional Engineers, 2011
- Karl Schwartzwalder Professional Achievement in Ceramic Engineering (PACE) Award, American Ceramic Society, 2010
- National Science Foundation CAREER Awards, 2007
- Presidential Award for Excellence in Science, Mathematics, and Engineering Mentoring, 2020
