= Paul F. Malloy =

American attorney and politician

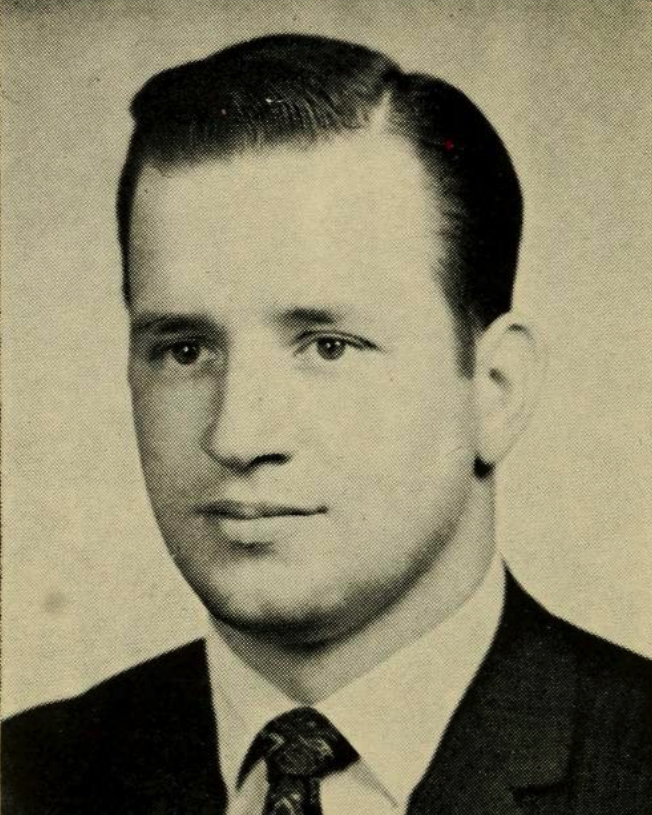

Member of the Massachusetts House of Representatives from the 12th Middlesex district
- In office January 8, 1969 – January 3, 1973
- Preceded by: Felix Perrault
- Succeeded by: Peter F. Harrington

Member of the Massachusetts House of Representatives from the 4th Middlesex district
- In office January 6, 1965 – January 8, 1969
- Preceded by: John W. Whittemore

Personal details
- Born: April 29, 1940 (age 86) Pittsburgh, Pennsylvania, U.S.
- Party: Democratic
- Education: Suffolk University; Portia Law School (LLB)

Paul F. Malloy (born April 29, 1940) is an American attorney and former politician who served four terms in the Massachusetts House of Representatives. A member of the Democratic Party, he was elected shortly after his graduation from law school. He represented the city of Newton, Massachusetts in the legislature.

Massachusetts House of Representatives
Preceded by John W. Whittemore	Massachusetts Representative from the 4th Middlesex District; 1965–1969; Served alongside: Joseph G. Bradley	Succeeded by
Preceded by Felix Perrault	Massachusetts Representative from the 12th Middlesex District; 1969–1973; Served alongside: H. James Shea Jr., Paul Guzzi	Succeeded by Peter F. Harrington
