= Jan Talbot =

Jan Talbot may refer to:

- Jan B. Talbot, American chemical engineer
- Jan Cameron (coach) (formerly Talbot), Australian swimming coach
