= Keramos =

Keramos may refer to:

- Ceramus, Former city in what is now Turkey
- Keramos (fraternity), professional fraternity for ceramic engineering students
