= Rohwer =

Rohwer most often refers to:

- Rohwer, Arkansas, United States
- Rohwer War Relocation Center, Japanese-American internment camp

Rohwer may also refer to:

== People with the surname ==
- Detlev Rohwer (1917–1944), German Luftwaffe ace
- Forest Rohwer (born 1969), American microbial ecologist
- Jürgen Rohwer (1924–2015), German historian
- Lars Rohwer (born 1972), German politician
- Lauren Rohwer, American scientist
- Ray Rohwer (1895–1988), American baseball player
- Sievert Allen Rohwer (1887–1951), American entomologist
- William Rohwer (1937–2016), American psychologist
