= Keramos (fraternity) =

American professional fraternity

- Founded: February 10, 1932; 94 years ago Washington, D.C., U.S.
- Type: Professional
- Affiliation: American Ceramic Society
- Status: Active
- Emphasis: Ceramic engineering
- Scope: National
- Colors: Cobalt blue and Gold
- Publication: Keragram
- Chapters: 10 active
- Headquarters: 470 Olde Worthington Road, Suite 200; Westerville, Ohio 43082; United States
- Website: Keramos website

Keramos is an American professional fraternity for ceramic engineering students. It was formed in 1932 from the merger of Beta Pi Kappa and Keramos. Keramos has chartered seventeen chapters at universities in the United States. It is affiliated with the American Ceramic Society.

== History ==
=== Predecessors ===
==== Beta Pi Kappa ====
Beta Pi Kappa (ΒΠΚ) was established at Ohio State University on September 30, 1902, by students in the department of ceramic engineering. Its known founders were Leonard Burnside Coulter, Arthur Frederick Greaves-Walker, Carl Hawthorn Griffin, W. B. Harris, Harry McMillien, LeRoy H. Minton, and Mark Ogan. Beta Pi Kappa's purpose was to promote ceramic engineering, to help members find professional jobs, and to help ceramic engineering gain recognition as part of the field of engineering.

The Greek letters Beta Pi Kappa were selected for the name of the fraternity to represent "Brick", "Pottery", and "Cement". Beta Pi Kappa's officers were the master potter (president), first assistant master potter (vice-president), second assistant master potter (secretary), third assistant master potter (treasurer), and fourth assistant master potter (herald). Coulter was its first master potter. Beta Pi Kappa's colors were black and red.

Beta Pi Kappa went inactive in 1906, due to low enrollent and the eventual graduation of the members. On March 25, 1926, the fraternity was revived at the North Carolina State College of Agriculture and Engineering (now North Carolina State University) by five students and Greaves-Walker, who had established the department of ceramic engineering there in September 1925. A third chapter was formed in February 1928 at the New York State College of Ceramics at Alfred University, from a local group that had formed on December 8, 1927, with the intent of joining Beta Pi Kappa.

Beta Pi Kappa held its first national convocation in Atlantic City, New Jersey on February 8, 1928, where a grand chapter was elected. Coulter was its first grand master potter.

==== Keramos ====
Keramos was established at the University of Illinois on February 10, 1915, as a fraternity for students of ceramics engineering, although planning discussions took place prior to that meeting. Its founders were Loren C. Bow, Orello S. Buckner, John A. Chase, Ralph R. Danielson, Lister A. Deaver, Fremont E. Hoehn, Silas C. Linbarger, John B. Lyon, Walter C. Millsom, Idris A. Nelson, Hugh S. Robertson, George S. Schaulin, Chester T. Treischel, and Arthur E. Williams. The founders were all undergraduates, except for Danielson who was a graduate student and assistant instructor. Nelson was elected as the fraternity's first president. Ray T. Stull, professor and head of the department of ceramic engineering, was the fraternity's first advisor.

Stull suggested the name Keramos because of its Sanskrit origins and its importance to ceramic engineers. Keramos was also the Greek word for clay. The fraternity's arch-shaped badge had a black field with an insized palmetto leaf, surrounded by ten or twelve pearls and the name "KERAMOS" across the bottom. The palmetto was chosen because it was the symbol of ancient Greek potters. The fraternity's colors were black and azure blue.

With plans to expand to other campuses, the University of Illinois chapter became the Alpha chapter and was referred to as the "Alpha of Keramos". However, the expansion plans were stalled by World War I, during which Keramos went inactive. When its members met on March 15, 1920, to re-establish the fraternity, only four student members remained. Two months later, its active membership had grown to twelve; in 1923 it had grown to eighteen.

Keramos was incorporated in the State of Illinois in 1924. In October 1924, a committee was formed to explore nationalization of the fraternity. A second chapter, Beta of Keramos, was established at Ohio State University on February 28, 1925.Beta of Keramos started the fraternity's publiciation, Keramosia, and initiated 58 members between 1925 and 1932.

=== Keramos ===
As early as 1927, Greaves-Walker pursued a merger of Beta Pi Kappa and Keramos. In 1930, both fraternities formed committees to explore merging; their first meetings were convened during the annual conference of the American Ceramic Society in Cleveland, Ohio in 1931. Having essentially agreed to a merger, the committees set the 1932 meeting of the American Ceramic Society in Washington, D.C., to report on the details of the merger. The merger process was overseen by Dr. George A. Bole.

Keramos was formed on February 10, 1932, at the Willard Hotel in Washington, D.C., from the merger of Beta Pi Kappa and Keramos. The name Keramos was selected for the new group, which adopted the former Beta Pi Kappa coat of arms and badge as its emblems. The new professional fraternity also patterned its ritual, constitution, and bylaws after those of Beta Pi Kappa. Although the Alpha chapter of Beta Pi Kappa was dormant at the time of the merger, the new fraternity continued to use 1902 and Ohio State University as its founding date and birthplace.

At the time of the merger, both fraternities had two active chapters, meaning that the new Keramos fraternity had four chapters: the University of Illinois, Ohio State University, North Carolina State University, and New York State College of Ceramics at Alfred University. Keramos was established as a professional fraternity for ceramic engineering students. Its mission was to promote interaction and camaraderie among ceramic engineering professionals and students and to promote scholarship and an interest in the profession of ceramic engineering, science, and technology. The fraternity was incorporated in the State of Illinois. Greaves-Walker was elected as the first grand president.

So that students who did not attend a college with a Keramos chapter could join, the fraternity created sub-chapters, with Keromos members on faculty serving as representatives. Sub-chapters were established in 1933 at the Georgia School of Technology, the Iowa State College of Agriculture and Mechanic Arts, the Missouri School of Mines and Metallurgy, the University of Washington. Other sub-chapters were formed at the Virginia Agricultural and Mechanical College and Polytechnic Institute (now Virginia Tech) in 1938, the University of Alabama in 1942, Clemson University in 1952, and the University of California, Berkeley and the University of Utah in 1962.

On March 2, 1940, the Virginia Ceramic Fraternity, a local student organization at Virginia Tech, was installed as the fifth chapter of Keramos. Another chapter was established on November 15, 1941, by absorbing the Iowa State Professional Ceramic Engineering Society at the Iowa State College. Chapters were established at the Rutgers School of Engineering and the Missouri University of Science and Technology in 1947.

In 1949, Keramos had 8 active chapters and 1,060 initiates. In 1960, the fraternity was incorporated in the State of North Carolina. By 1963, the fraternity had established 12 chapters and had initiated 2,575 members. In 1991, it had thirteen active chapters and 3,542 initiates.

Keramos is affiliated with the American Ceramic Society which is based in Westerville, Ohio.

== Symbols ==
The fraternity's name came from κεραμος, Keramos, the Greek word for ceramics or clay. When Beta Pi Kappa and Keramos merged, the coat-of-arms of Beta Pi Kappa was adopted with the substitution of "KERAMOS" in the motto at the bottom. The badge of Karamos is the former Beta Pi Kappa badge, with the substitution of "Keramos" for "ΒΠΚ". The badge had four concave sides and a black enamel center that was surrounded by a thin line of gold. The enamel has the word "Keramos" with three stars above and a new moon and two stars below.

The fraternity's colors are cobalt blue and gold. Its publication is the Keragram.

== Chapters ==
The following is a list of Keramos chapters, with active chapters indicated in bold and inactive chapters in italics.

Chapter	Charter date and range (Note: The first four chapters existed before the 1932 merger that formed the fraternity and retained their original charter dates.)	Institution	Location	Status	Ref.
Ohio	September 30, 1902 – 1906; February 25, 1925 – xxxx ?	Ohio State University	Columbus, Ohio	Inactive	(Note: The Alpha chapter of Beta Pi Kappa started at Ohio and went inactive in 1906. The Beta of Kreamos chapter of the original Keramos fraternity was chartered in 1925. The latter became a chapter of the merged fraternity; however, the date of the Beta Pi Kappa was continued to be used for the national fraternity's founding date.)
**Illinois**	February 10, 1915 – 1918; March 10, 1920	University of Illinois Urbana-Champaign	Urbana, Illinois	Active	(Note: Founded as the Alpha chapter of the original Keramos fraternity. The chapter went inactive during World War I.)
North Carolina	March 31, 1925 – 1943; 1946–1971	North Carolina State University	Raleigh, North Carolina	Inactive	(Note: Originally was the second chapter of Beta Pi Kappa, established by A. F. Greaves-Walker of the Alpha chapter who was teaching at the North Carolina State College of Agriculture and Engineering at the time. The chapter went inactive during World War II and was reactivated in the fall of 1946. Its charter was withdrawn in 1973, when the university discontinued its ceramics engineering program.)
**New York**	February 7, 1928	New York State College of Ceramics at Alfred University	Alfred, New York	Active	(Note: Chapter was established as Delta Pi Alpha on December 8, 1927, to become a chapter of Beta Pi Kappa. It became the New York chapter of Beta Pi Kappa on February 7, 1928.)
**Virginia**	March 2, 1940 – 1943; 1946–1959; 1961–1973; xxxx ?	Virginia Tech	Blacksburg, Virginia	Active	(Note: Virgina Tech operated as a sub-chapter, starting on February 11, 1938. The chapter was formed by absorbing the Virginia Ceramic Fraternity. It went inactive during World War II and, again, in 1973 due to a lack of student members.)
Iowa	November 15, 1941 – xxxx ?	Iowa State University	Ames, Iowa	Inactive	(Note: A colony of Beta Pi Kappa was established at Iowa State in 1925 by the NCSU chapter; however, it is unknown whether it was ever chartered. A sub-chapter of Keramos was formed at Iowa in 1933. The chapter was formed in 1941 by absorbing the Iowa State Professional Ceramic Engineering Society.)
**New Jersey**	April 23, 1947	Rutgers School of Engineering	Piscataway, New Jersey	Active	(Note: Chapter formed from the Rutgers Ceramic Honorary Fraternity, a group established in the fall of 1946 to become a chapter of Keramos.)
**Missouri**	July 26, 1947	Missouri University of Science and Technology	Rolla, Missouri	Active	(Note: Formed as a sub-chapter in 1933. The chapter was formed from the Missouri School of Mines Honorary Ceramic Club, established in 1947, to become a Keramos chapter.)
**Pennsylvania**	December 3, 1948 – 1954; 1956	Pennsylvania State University	University Park, Pennsylvania	Active	(Note: Chapter formed from the Pennsylvania State College Ceramic Fraternity, established in March 1948 with the intention of becoming a chapter of Keramos. It temporarily went inactive in the 1950s due to low enrollment.)
Georgia	April 14, 1950 – xxxx ?	Georgia Tech	Atlanta, Georgia	Inactive	
**Washington**	April 30, 1952	University of Washington	Seattle, Washington	Active	(Note: Chapter originally formed the Professional Ceramists Club, originally a sub-chapter of the Missouri chapter.)
Texas	April 25, 1955 – April 23, 1960	University of Texas	Austin, Texas	Inactive	(Note: Chapter formed from The Arcilla Society, established in the fall of 1954 to become a chapter of Keramos. The chapter's charter was withdrawn due to inactivity, followed by an announcement that the university planned to discontinue its ceramics engineering program.)
**South Carolina**	January 10, 1958	Clemson University	Clemson, South Carolina	Active	(Note: Operated as a sub-chapter of the Georgia chapter beginning in 1950. In the fall of 1956, the Clemson Ceramic Club was established to become a chapter of Keramos.)
Florida	June 12, 1976 – xxxx ?	University of Florida	Gainesville, Florida	Inactive	
**Arizona**	After 1977	University of Arizona	Tucson, Arizona	Active	
Connecticut	2013–20xx ?	University of Connecticut	Storrs, Connecticut	Inactive	
**Colorado**	November 2016	Colorado School of Mines	Golden, Colorado	Active	

== Membership ==
Membership in Keramos is limited to ceramics engineering undergraduate and graduate students who demonstrate academic achievement and high character.

== Governance ==
Keramos is governed by a biennial convocation, where an executive council is elected. Its executive council consists of a national president, national vice-president, national herald, national recording secretary, national treasurer, general secretary, and the immediate past national president.

== Notable members ==
- Charles Fergus Binns (New York, honorary), studio potter and the first director of the New York State School of Clayworking and Ceramics at Alfred University
- Delbert Day (Missouri, 1955), curator's professor emeritus of ceramic engineering at Missouri University of Science and Technology
- Arthur F. Greaves-Walker (Alpha of Beta Pi Kappa/Ohio, 1902) founder and head of the ceramics engineering department at North Carolina State University and the Engineering Industrial Experiemental Station of the University of Florida
- Larry L. Hench (Ohio, 1960), emeritus professor at the University of Florida and chair of the Ceramic Materials Department at Imperial College London
- Major E. Holmes (New York, 1933), dean of the New York State College of Ceramics at Alfred University
- LeRoy H. Minton (Alpha of Beta Pi Kappa/Ohio, 1902), director and general superintendent of the General Ceramics Company
- Lane Mitchell (Illinois, 1932), founder and head of the Department of Ceramic Engineering at Georgia Tech
- Mark Ogan (Alpha of Beta Pi Kappa/Ohio, 1902), ceramic engineer
- Edward Orton Jr. (Alpha of Beta Pi Kappa/Ohio, 1904, honorary), dean of the Ohio State College of Engineering, first chairman of a school of ceramic engineering at Ohio State University
- Ray T. Stull (Illinois, 1915, honorary), professor at the University of Illinois and senior ceramics engineer with the United States Bureau of Standards
- Kenji Uchino (1993, honorary), academy professor of electrical engineering at Pennsylvania State University and associate director of the U.S. Office of Naval Research – Global Tokyo Office
- John W. Whittemore (North Carolina, 1935, honorary), head of ceramic engineering, associate dean and then dean of the School of Engineering and Architecture, and director of the Engineering Extension Station at Virginia Tech, from 1926 to 1962
