= Covington High School (Ohio) =

Location
- 807 Chestnut Street; Covington, Ohio 45318; United States; 40°7′10″N 84°20′33″W

Information
- Opened: 1748
- School district: Covington Exempted Village Schools
- Superintendent: Joe Hoelzle
- Principal: Bridgit Kerber
- Staff: 16.62 (FTE)
- Grades: 9 - 12
- Enrollment: 229 (2023–2024)
- Average class size: 70
- Student to teacher ratio: 13.78
- Color
- Fight song: 'Hang On Sloopy'
- Athletics conference: Three Rivers Conference
- Mascot: Buccy the Buccaneer
- Nickname: Buccaneers
- Rival: Bradford
- Yearbook: Covington Yearbook
- Website: School website

Covington High School is a public high school in Covington, Ohio. It is the only high school in the Covington Exempted Village School District. Their teams are nicknamed the Buccaneers, or Buccs, while their basketball mascot is Buccy the Buccaneer.

== Extramural events ==
Sports at the school include football, basketball, volleyball, cheer, cross country, track and field, swimming, baseball, softball, golf, and wrestling. As of 2021, the school belongs to the Three Rivers Conference. Students may also participate in marching band.

== Notable alumni ==
- LeRoy H. Minton, ceramics engineer
