= Ohio Society of New York =

American patriotic and social organization

- Formation: November 10, 1885
- Website: www.ohiosocietyny.org

The Ohio Society of New York is an historical, social, and patriotic organization established in 1885 and based in New York City. It is the oldest state society in New York.

== History ==
The Ohio Society of New York was founded by Civil War General Thomas Ewing Jr., when he and several other prominent gentlemen of Ohio roots living in New York City met on November 10, 1885, and made the first entry into the society's first minute book. They met 10 days later, on November 20, 1885, and adopted a constitution.

Initially a dining society, the group later leased private rooms at the Waldorf Astoria (then located on Fifth Avenue and 33rd Street) until 1929, the Hotel Pennsylvania until 1962, and the Biltmore until 1977.

The society is perhaps best known for its extravagant annual banquets which, during the 1800s and 1900s, were often oversubscribed and frequently reported on by the media. It continues to hold meetings and events today.

== Membership ==
Candidates must be invited to join by a member who will act as proposer and facilitate the introduction of another member willing to second the nomination. Candidates must then meet with and be approved by the board of governors. Eligibility may be established by Ohio ancestral lineage, residence, or education. The Governor of Ohio and Bishop of Ohio are customarily admitted to membership.

== Notable members ==
Public officials

- William B. Allison, U.S. Senator
- Calvin S. Brice, U.S. Senator (founding member)
- William C. Cooper, U.S. Representative
- James M. Cox, Governor of Ohio
- Martin L. Davey, Governor of Ohio
- Stephen B. Elkins, U.S. Secretary of War
- Charles Foster, Governor of Ohio, U.S. Secretary of the Treasury
- George W. Geddes, U.S. Representative
- Newton Gilbert, Lt. Governor of Indiana
- Mark Hanna, U.S. Senator
- Warren G. Harding, 29th President of the United States
- Judson Harmon, Governor of Ohio
- John Hay, U.S. Secretary of State, U.S. Ambassador to the Court of St. James's (honorary member)
- Rutherford B. Hayes, 19th President of the United States (honorary member)
- Myron T. Herrick, Governor of Ohio
- Charles D. Hilles, Private Secretary to President William H. Taft
- Hugh Judge Jewett, U.S. Representative
- John P. Jones, U.S. Senator
- Stanley Matthews, U.S. Supreme Court Justice
- Henry B. Payne, U.S. Senator
- Preston B. Plumb, U.S. Senator
- Ogden Reid, U.S. Representative
- Whitelaw Reid, U.S. Ambassador to the Court of St. James's
- Milton Sayler, U.S. Representative
- John Sherman, U.S. Senator, U.S. Secretary of State, U.S. Secretary of the Treasury
- William Henry Smith, Ohio Secretary of State
- Milton I. Southard, U.S. Representative (founding member)
- William L. Strong, mayor of New York City (founding member)
- William Howard Taft, 27th President of the United States (honorary member)
- Robert A. Taft Jr., U.S. Senator, U.S. Representative
- William H. Upson, U.S. Supreme Court Justice
- Morrison R. Waite, Chief Justice, U.S. Supreme Court
- George White, Governor of Ohio

Army and naval officers

- General Thomas Ewing Jr. (founding member)
- General Philip H. Sheridan (honorary member)
- General William T. Sherman (honorary member)
- Major General Wager Swayne
- Brigadier General George King Hunter
- Brigadier General Chase Wilmot Kennedy
- Brigadier General Julius Augustus Penn
- Brevet Brigadier General Anson G. McCook (founding member)
- Brevet Brigadier General Henry Lawrence Burnett (founding member)
- Brevet Brigadier General Thomas T. Eckert, Assistant Secretary of War
- Commodore Harold Eldridge
- Captain Calvin E. Coulter
- Captain John C. Leonard
- Colonel John L. Bond
- Colonel Berkeley Enochs
- Colonel Wm. Perry Fogg (founding member)
- Colonel Henry O. S. Heistand
- Colonel Benson W. Hough
- Colonel John James McCook
- Colonel C. W. Moulton (founding member)
- Colonel James W. Van Dusen
- Colonel Charles C. Walcutt Jr.
- Commander Frank T. Watrous
- Lieutenant Colonel Chauncey B. Baker
- Lieutenant Colonel Richard T. Ellis
- Major Ephraim C. Dawes

Other notable members

- Paul D. Cravath, founding partner of Cravath, Swain & Moore
- Thomas Edison (honorary member)
- Harvey S. Firestone
- B.F. Goodrich
- Augustus D. Juilliard
- LeRoy H. Minton
- John D. Rockefeller
- Algernon S. Sullivan, founding partner of Sullivan & Cromwell
