= William R. Boone High School =

Location
- 1000 E. Kaley; Orlando, Florida 32806; United States; 28.51878°N 81.36515°W

Information
- School type: Public high school
- Motto: Boone Students Today, Brave Leaders Tomorrow
- Established: 1952
- School district: Orange County Public Schools
- Principal: Hector Maestre
- Teaching staff: 127.00 (on an FTE basis)
- Grades: 9-12
- Enrollment: 2,769 (2023–2024)
- Student to teacher ratio: 21.80
- Campus type: Urban
- Colors: Orange , white
- Mascot: Brave
- Rival: Edgewater High School
- Newspaper: hi-lights
- Yearbook: Legend
- Website: boonehs.ocps.net

William Rennick Boone High School is a public high school in Orlando, Florida. Built in 1952, the school is one of twenty-two high schools in the Orange County Public Schools system.

== History ==
Two new high schools, North Orlando and South Orlando, were built after World War II to take the place of Orlando High School (which was converted into what is now Howard Middle School). The last principal of Orlando High School, William R. Boone (1892–1952), died of a heart condition before the two new schools were opened in 1952, so the school board dedicated South Orlando High School in his memory, then christened North Orlando High School as Edgewater High School, after its surrounding community.

== Campus ==
In the fall of 2005, Boone High School was rededicated after an eight-year campus renovation process was completed. The renovation included a new media center.

== Academics ==
For the school year 2007–2008, Boone received an "A" under the school rating system. For the 2008–2009 school year, BHS again received an A, making it the only "A" school in Orlando, and one of only two in Orange County. Boone offers several college-preparatory and technical education programs. College bound students can participate in the Distinguished Scholars program and the Gifted program. Students seeking technical preparation can participate in programs such as drafting, early childhood education, and Tech Prep. Students can dual enroll with local community colleges and technical schools for courses specific to careers.

=== Academies ===
==== Magnet Programs ====
The school offers three magnet programs (see magnet schools), which attract students from all over Orange County. These programs (the Law Magnet, the Academy of Finance, and the Criminal Justice Academy) offer four years' worth of elective courses with an aim of preparing students for similar majors in college. All of these tracks have won awards from the county and state.

==== Other ====
Other (non-magnet) academies at Boone include the Creative Arts Academy, the Health-care Academy, and the Academy of Information Technology.

=== Advanced placement ===
Boone also offers Advanced Placement (AP) courses. Students of any year (freshman through senior) may take an AP course.

	Social Sciences and the Arts	Hard Sciences
Courses Offered	Spanish, French, English Language English Literature, Psychology, Micro-Economics, Macro-Economics; U.S. Government, U.S. History, European History, World History, Human Geography, Art History, Studio Art, Music Theory	Calculus AB, Calculus BC, Physics B, Physics C *pending removal*, Chemistry, Biology, Environmental Science, Statistics

== Student life ==
=== Academic ===
The Mock Trial team won the State Championship in 2006.

The theatre department puts on several productions each year. In their most recent season, their productions consisted of "A Little Princess: Sara's Heart" (a world premiere), "Boys, Bois, Boyz", (another world premier) and "Chicago: The Musical". Thespian Troupe 1139 competes in local and state theater competitions. They won a total of seven "Best in Shows" as well as the "Critics Choice" acting award in this latest season at the Districts Level. In early 2009, the drama department formed an improvisation troupe, Deep Thoughts, which plays several shows a year to this day.

The Legend yearbook has received the Gold Crown from Columbia Scholastic Press Association for its 2006 and 2007 books. In 2010 Hi-lights (the school newspaper) received a Silver Crown. Both publications have been Pacemaker Finalists from National Scholastic Press Association.

==== Listing of academic clubs ====
Course-based	Pre-professional	Other
Art Club	B.B.C Club	Writing Center
Drama Club	Florida Future Educators of America	Math Center
French Club	Hi-Lights (School newspaper)	Mu Alpha Theta
Math Club	Health Occupations Students of America(H.O.S.A)	Spanish Honor Society
Spanish Club	Legend Yearbook	Tri-M Music Honor Society
Web-Tech Club	Police Cadets	Social Justice Club

==== Brave TV/News ====
Boone's News Report is recorded the school day before, and will reports on important opportunities, activities, and sports news to students. During the first quarter the code of conduct will be addressed on Brave Tv.

==== Music ====
The music department includes the following areas of study:

Band

- Wind Ensemble
- Symphonic Band
- Concert Band
- Jazz Ensemble
- Percussion Ensemble
- Color Guard
- Marching Band- an ensemble that is the combined forces of the Wind Ensemble, Symphonic Band, Concert Band, Percussion Ensembles, and Color Guard

Chorus

- Voices of Bravery: Beginning and Advanced Men's Choir
- Doce Voce: Intermediate Female Choir
- Bella Voce: Beginning Female Choir
- Bel Canto: Advanced Women's Choir
- Varsity: Mixed Choir
- Vocality: Acapella Choir
- Vocal Techniques

Orchestra

- Beginning Orchestra
- Concert Orchestra
- Sinfonia (Intermediate) Orchestra
- Counterpoint (Upper Intermediate) Orchestra
- Chamber Orchestra

Piano-Keyboard

- Keyboard I
- Keyboard II, III, IV

Theory

- Music Theory
- AP Music Theory

=== Athletic ===
Boone is a member of the Orlando Metro Conference, and participates among the largest classes of the FHSAA state athletic competitions. Boone has held a rivalry with Edgewater High School since both schools opened in 1952. The schools compete in football each year in a game dubbed "The Battle for the Barrel" for a "Spirit Barrel."

==== Athletic teams by season ====
Fall	Winter	Spring	Club sports
Football	Boys' basketball	Flag football	Crew (Rowing)
Cheerleading	Girls' basketball	Spring Football	Roller hockey
Girls' volleyball	Girls' Soccer	Baseball	Dance crew
Cross-country	Boys' Soccer	Softball	Bravettes
Swimming	Wrestling	Track and field	
Golf	Weightlifting	Tennis	
Bowling		Lacrosse	
		Boys' Volleyball	
		Water polo	
		Weightlifting	

== Student body composition ==
Boone High School has 3,000 students and 230 faculty and staff members. Almost one quarter of the students receive free or reduced lunch, and the population served by Exceptional Student Services is growing. As of 2005, Boone is a magnet for the deaf/hard-of-hearing population of Orange County and provides many outreach programs to the community including the American Sign Language club.

== Notable alumni ==
- Cody Allen, pitcher for the Los Angeles Angels
- Marvin Bracy, member of the United States 2016 Olympic Track Team
- Malcolm Bricklin, businessman and automotive entrepreneur
- Wilma Burgess, country music singer
- Ericka Dunlap, winner of the Miss America pageant in 2004
- Eric Griffin (born 1990), basketball player for Hapoel Be'er Sheva of the Israeli Basketball Premier League
- Ron Karkovice, former MLB player
- Stacey Mack, former American football running back for the Jacksonville Jaguars and the Houston Texans of the NFL
- Mike Maroth, former MLB pitcher for the Detroit Tigers and St Louis Cardinals; current pitching coach for the Class A Florida Fire Frogs
- Isaiah Mizell, college football wide receiver for the Arizona Wildcats
- Joe Oliver, former catcher for the Cincinnati Reds
- Jason Preston, point guard for the Utah Jazz
- Clara Rivero-Baleine, materials scientist and optical engineer
- Antonio Tarver, retired boxer
- Johnny Townsend, punter for the Oakland Raiders
- Tommy Townsend, punter for the Houston Texans
