= Tommy Townsend =

American football player (born 1996)

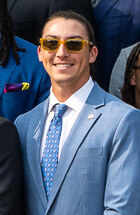
- Townsend in 2023

No. 3 – Tennessee Titans
- Position: Punter
- Roster status: Injured reserve

Personal information
- Born: November 12, 1996 (age 30); Orlando, Florida, U.S.
- Listed height: 6 ft 1 in (1.85 m)
- Listed weight: 191 lb (87 kg)

Career information
- High school: Boone (Orlando)
- College: Tennessee (2015); Florida (2016–2019)
- NFL draft: 2020: undrafted

Career history
- Kansas City Chiefs (2020–2023); Houston Texans (2024–2025); Tennessee Titans (2026–present)

Awards and highlights
- 2× Super Bowl champion (LVII, LVIII); First-team All-Pro (2022); Pro Bowl (2022); PFWA All-Rookie Team (2020)

Career NFL statistics as of Week 7, 2026
- Punts: 379
- Punting yards: 18,101
- Average Punt: 47.8
- Net punting average: 42.8
- Inside 20: 161
- Longest punt: 76
- Stats at Pro Football Reference

Thomas Townsend (born November 12, 1996) is an American professional football punter for the Tennessee Titans of the National Football League (NFL). He played college football for the Tennessee Volunteers and Florida Gators, and was signed by the Kansas City Chiefs as an undrafted free agent in 2020.

== Professional career ==
Pre-draft measurables
Height	Weight	Arm length	Hand span	Wingspan	40-yard dash	10-yard split	20-yard split
6 ft 1 3/8 in (1.86 m)	191 lb (87 kg)	32 1/8 in (0.82 m)	9 1/8 in (0.23 m)	6 ft 4 1/2 in (1.94 m)	4.75 s	1.64 s	2.74 s
All values from NFL Combine

=== Kansas City Chiefs ===
==== 2020 season ====
Townsend signed with the Kansas City Chiefs as an undrafted free agent on April 30, 2020. In the fourth game of his rookie season, he had two punts that went 65 yards against the New England Patriots. He finished the game with an average of 60.8 yards, a Chiefs franchise record for punt average in a game (minimum 4 attempts), 47.8 yard net average. On November 1, he completed his first career pass on a fake punt against the New York Jets. The completion went for 13 yards, which resulted in a first down. In Week 15 against the New Orleans Saints, Townsend punted six times, landing three inside the 20-yard-line with a long of 61 yards, earning the American Football Conference (AFC) Special Teams Player of the Week. Overall, Townsend finished the 2020 season with 52 punts for 2,339 net yards for a 44.98 average. For his rookie season, he was named to the Pro Football Writers Association's All-Rookie team.

In the Chiefs' playoff game against the Cleveland Browns, he did not punt a single time for the first time in his career. It was the second time in franchise history a Chiefs punter did not punt a single time in a playoff game. The other was Jason Baker in 2003. The Chiefs reached Super Bowl LV but lost 31–9 to the Tampa Bay Buccaneers. Townsend punted three times for 107 yards in the loss.

==== 2021 season ====
In the Chiefs' Week 9 game against the Green Bay Packers, Townsend punted six times with an average of punt of 56.8 yards with five being downed inside the 20 yard line. For his performance, he was named AFC Special Teams player of the week. The following week, he completed his second career pass on a fake punt for 16 yards. After kicking six punts inside the 20-yard line, as well as completing a pass on a fake punt, Townsend was named the AFC Special Teams Player of the Month for November. He was placed on the Reserve/COVID-19 list on December 24, 2021. On December 26, his brother Johnny started in replacement of him. He was activated on December 29. Overall, Townsend finished the season with 37 punts for 1,746 net yards for a 47.19 average.

==== 2022 season ====
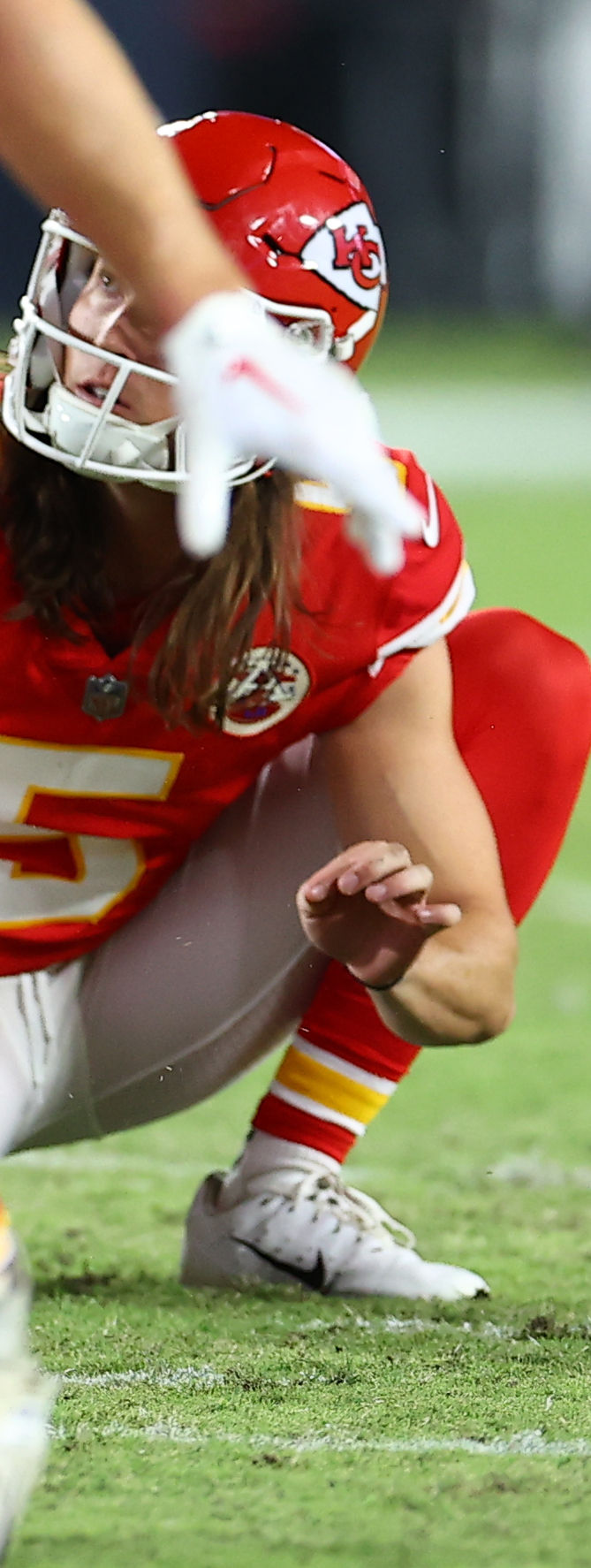
Townsend in 2022

Townsend earned AFC Special Teams Player of the Month for September. He earned AFC Special Teams Player of the Week honors for his Week 15 game against the Houston Texans. He finished the 2022 season with 53 punts for 2,672 net yards for a 50.42 average. For his efforts, he earned Pro Bowl and first team All-Pro honors. In Super Bowl LVII, Townsend punted twice for 98 yards in the Chiefs 38–35 victory over the Philadelphia Eagles.

==== 2023 season ====
Townsend finished the 2023 season with 59 punts for 2,776 net yards for a 47.05 average. In Super Bowl LVIII, Townsend punted five times for 254 yards in the Chiefs' 25–22 victory over the San Francisco 49ers, giving Townsend his second straight championship.

=== Houston Texans ===
On March 15, 2024, Townsend signed a two-year contract with the Houston Texans. In the 2024 season, he punted 76 times for 3,649 yards for a 48.01 average.

In Week 17 of the 2025 season, Townsend punted five times, with four landing inside the 20-yard line in a 20–16 win over the Los Angeles Chargers, earning AFC Special Teams Player of the Week. He finished the 2025 season with 72 punts for 3,424 yards for a 47.6 average.

=== Tennessee Titans ===
On March 12, 2026, Townsend signed a two-year, $6 million contract with the Tennessee Titans.

On November 14, Townsend was placed on injured reserve with Achilles and left knee injuries and would have to miss at least four games.

== NFL career statistics ==
Legend
	Won the Super Bowl
**Bold**	Career high

=== Regular season ===
Year	Team	GP	Punting					
Year	Team	GP	Punts	Yds	Lng	Avg	Blk	Ins20
2020	KC	16	52	2,339	67	45.0	0	20
2021	KC	16	37	1,746	68	47.7	0	20
2022	KC	17	53	2,672	**76**	**50.4**	0	22
2023	KC	17	59	2,776	68	47.1	0	20
2024	HOU	17	**76**	**3,649**	69	48.0	**1**	**39**
2025	HOU	17	72	3,424	73	47.6	0	30
2026	TEN	7	30	1,475	65	49.2	0	10
Career		107	379	18,101	76	47.8	1	161

=== Postseason ===
Year	Team	GP	Punting					
Year	Team	GP	Punts	Yds	Lng	Avg	Blk	Ins20
2020	KC	3	4	151	51	37.8	0	0
2021	KC	3	10	435	57	43.5	0	**5**
2022	KC	3	10	452	60	45.2	0	**5**
2023	KC	4	**15**	**715**	62	47.7	0	4
2024	HOU	2	6	266	67	44.3	0	1
2025	HOU	2	8	419	**72**	**52.4**	0	2
Career		17	53	2,438	72	46.0	0	17

== Personal life ==
Townsend is an Eagle Scout. His older brother, Johnny, is a former professional punter who also played at the University of Florida.
