= Delbert Day =

American engineer

- Education: Missouri School of Mines; Pennsylvania State University
- Known for: TheraSphere and Glasphalt co-invention
- Title: Curator's Professor Emeritus of Materials Sciences (Missouri S&T)
- Spouse: Shirley Ann Day (Foraker) (m. 1956; died 2014)
- Children: 2
- Awards: Distinguished Alumni Award (PSU)

Delbert E. Day, a Curator's Professor Emeritus of Ceramic Engineering at Missouri University of Science and Technology, made the first U.S. glass melting experiments in micro-gravity on NASA's Space Shuttle.

Day was elected a member of the National Academy of Engineering in 2004 for the development of radiotherapeutic glass microspheres and their transfer to medical applications. He is also a fellow of the Society of Glass Technology, American Ceramic Society, National Institute of Ceramic Engineers, and National Academy of Inventors.

Day earned a Bachelor of Science degree in ceramic engineering from the Missouri School of Mines and Metallurgy (now Missouri S&T) in 1958, and a Master of Science degree and doctorate in ceramic technology from Pennsylvania State University in 1959 and 1961, respectively.

Day co-invented TheraSphere glass microspheres for medical and dental applications, and Glasphalt which recycles waste glass for use in asphalt paving. In 1984, Day founded the Mo-Sci Corporation in Rolla, Missouri, which manufacturers high-tech glass products; as of 2007, the company was solely owned by Day's son, Ted. The company was acquired by Heraeus in 2021 after Ted died in 2020.

In 2011, the Delbert Day Cancer Institute was initiated at the Phelps County Regional Medical Center (now Phelps Health), funded by a gift from Day's son and daughter-in-law, Ted and Kim Day. The 37,000-square-foot (3,400 m^{2}) facility, completed in January 2017, occupies the first two floors of a new building on the north side of the medical center campus.

Day and his wife, Shirley, donated to his Missouri S&T alma mater for establishment of a Day Family Endowed Scholarship in Materials Science & Engineering.

In May 2019, Day received the Distinguished Alumni Award from Penn State University, their highest honor for alumni.
