= Sanjay Mathur =

Inorganic chemist (b. 1968)

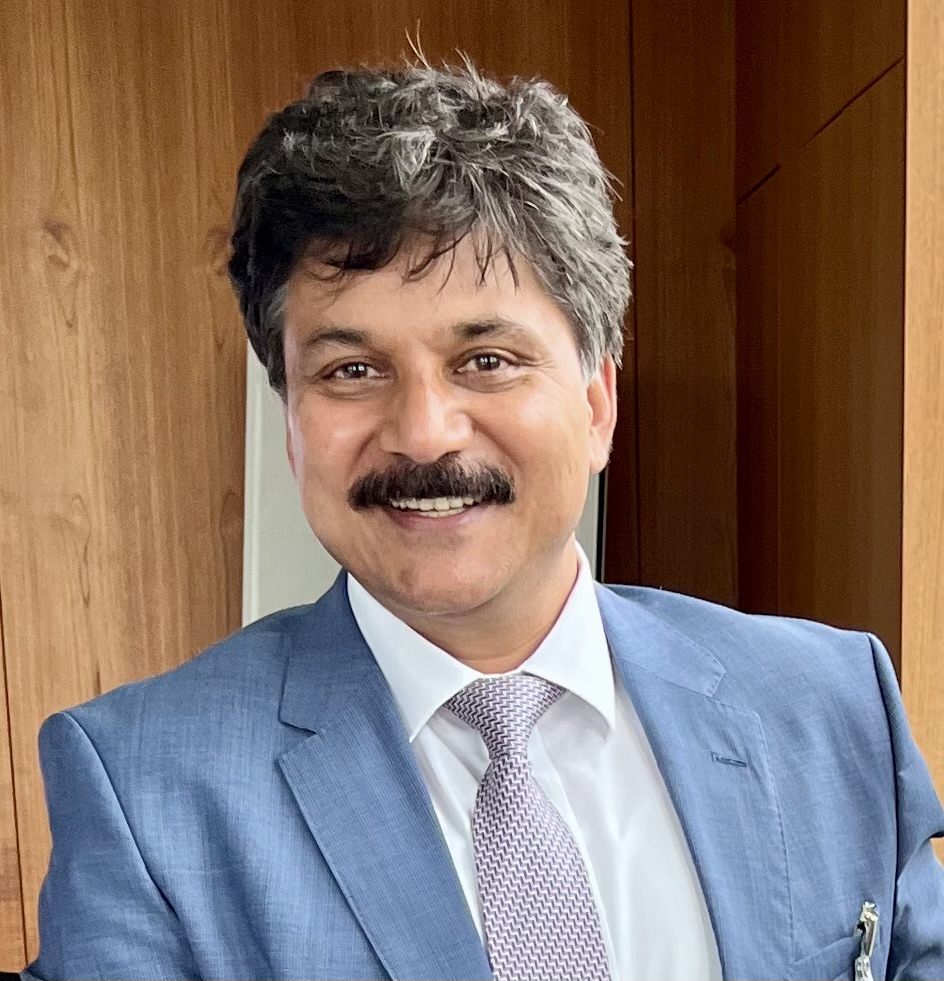
- Born: 1968 (age 57–58); Ujjain, India
- Education: Saarland University University of Rajasthan Vikram University
- Known for: Metal organic precursors, Ceramics, Biomaterials, Thin film systems, Sensors & Batteries
- Scientific career
- Fields: Nanomaterials, Organometallic chemistry, Nanobiotechnology, Energy materials
- Workplaces: University of Cologne
- Thesis: (1993)
- Doctoral advisor: Ram Charan Mehrotra

Sanjay Mathur (born 1968) is an inorganic chemist, past president (Oct. 2022 - Oct. 2023) of the American Ceramic Society, acting director of the Institute of Inorganic Chemistry at the University of Cologne, honorary co-director of the Institute of Renewable Energy Sources at the Xi'an Jiaotong University, and a World Class University Professor at the Chonbuk University. He is an adjunct professor at the Indian Institutes of Technology in Chennai and has held visiting professorships at the Central South University, the Tokyo University of Agriculture and Technology, the National Institute of Science Education and Research. He was awarded the Honorary Doctorate of the Vilnius University in 2016. He is an elected fellow of the American Ceramic Society, the American Society for Metals, the European Science Academy, the Indian National Science Academy and has been awarded with the fellowships of the Alexander von Humboldt Foundation. Mathur is known for his library of single source precursors for the production of nanostructured ceramic materials with tailormade properties, attaining a h-index of 84 and over 25000 citations.

== Biography ==
In 1994 he moved to Germany, joined the Saarland University as an Alexander von Humboldt Fellow (1994-1996). Following this, he worked for his habilitation (2004) at the Saarland University until he accepted an offer of the Würzburg University in 2006 to become a Professor of Inorganic Chemistry. At the Würzburg University he established a research programm on the synthesis of nanomaterials and thin film systems by means of chemical vapour deposition using chemically tailored organometallic precursors. In 2008, he was offered a full professorship in Inorganic and Materials Chemistry at the University of Cologne which he accepted. He established the Steinbeis technology-transfer center Materials Alliance Cologne, which supports small- and medium-sized enterprises to innovate their technology portfolio.

Mathur serves as Board member for the German Ceramic Society and the federation of chemical industries ChemCologne in Rhineland. Mathur has mentored a number of doctoral and postdoctoral researchers from a large number of nations. He has also served as the "International Ambassador" of the University of Cologne to foster international collaboration. He has received calls as the director of the Institute for Functional Materials in KTH Royal Institute of Technology (2013) and director of Institute for Technologies of Ceramic Components and Composites at the Stuttgart University (2020).

== Research ==
Mathur's research focuses on chemical concepts for the synthesis and processing of nanostructured ceramics and composites through the transformation of specially developed chemical feedstocks for energy and health applications. His research group has developed approaches for processing metal oxide nanoparticles, nanowires and nanostructured coatings, applicable in the fields of biomedicine (e.g. drug delivery and implant integration), sensing (gas and moisture detection), protective coatings (including barrier and anti-corrosion solutions) and functional surface modifications (e.g. transparent conductive oxides, photocatalytic materials and hydrophobic/hydrophilic coatings).

Mathur has also played a role in coordinating joint research projects with European consortia and industrial partners. He has been involved in technology transfer and collaboration with industry, particularly in the areas of sensors, electrodes, filters, catalytic supports and battery applications.

== Academic ==
Mathur has published more than 500 articles including 15 reviews and book chapters. He has been invited to speak at over 200 international conferences, has given over 250 seminars in 35 countries and has chaired/co-chaired several international conferences and symposia. He has edited 11 book in the field of nanomaterials science and engineering and is the co-owner of 11 patents originated in joint research projects and industrial collaboration. Mathur has led joint research projects with industry and has been involved with technology transfer and industrial collaborations. He serves as the Faculty Advisor for the International Chapters of the Materials Research Society, jointly recognized by the European Materials Research Society (E-MRS) as well as the American Ceramic Society International Germany Chapter established at the University of Cologne.

== Awards and recognition ==
- 2010: Global Star Award of the ECD of American Ceramic Society
- 2012: Academician, World Academy of Ceramics, Italy
- 2012: International Ambassador, University of Cologne
- 2014: World Class University Distinguished Professor, Chonbuk University, Korea
- 2014: Fellow, the American Ceramic Society
- 2015: Bridge-Building Award, American Ceramic Society
- 2016: Lee Hsun Award, Institute of Materials Res – Chinese Academy of Science, China
- 2016: Honorary Doctorate (h.c.), Vilnius University, Lithuania
- 2017: Fellow, the ASM International, USA
- 2019: Awarded, President’s Appreciation Award, KITECH, Korea
- 2019: Lifetime Achievement Award, Indian Science Congress Association, Kolkata, India
- 2020: Fellow of the European Academy of Science
- 2020: Elected to serve on the DFG Expert Panel (Fachkollegiat) for Functional Materials
- 2020: Appointed as Board Member of the German Ceramic Society
- 2021: Elected as Fellow of the Indian National Science Academy
- 2021: Elected Member of European Academy of Science, Brussels
- 2021: Appointed to European Materials Research Council, Strasbourg
- 2021: Elected Member, International Union of Materials Research Societies
- 2021: Woody White Award, Materials Research Society, USA
- 2022: International Frontiers Award of International Union of Materials Research Societies
- 2022: Orton Jr. Lectureship Award of the American Ceramic Society, USA
- 2022: Elected Secretary of the International Unions of MRS (IU-MRS)
- 2022: President, American Ceramic Society (2022–23)
- 2023: Medal for Excellence in Chemical Research, Chemical Research Society India
