= LeRoy H. Minton =

American ceramics engineer (1882–1931)

- LeRoy H. Minton, c. 1922
- Born: 1882; Covington, Ohio, U.S.
- Died: December 16, 1931 (aged 48–49); Metuchen, New Jersey, U.S.
- Education: Ohio State University, E.M., 1905
- Occupations: Ceramics engineer and consulting engineer
- Employer(s): Mozaic Tile Company Atlantic Terra Cotta Company; Wilkes-Barre Terra Cotta Co. General Ceramics Company
- Organization: American Ceramic Society

LeRoy H. Minton (1882 – December 16, 1931) was an American businessman, ceramics engineer, and consulting engineer. He served as director and general superintendent of the General Ceramics Company and as an engineer at the Atlantic Terra Cotta Company. He made important contributions in developing color terracotta and was a nationally known authority on ceramics. He also helped establish the Department of Ceramics at Rutgers University.

== Early life ==
Minton was born in 1882 in Covington, Ohio. His parents were Lauretta (née Himes) and Abram Wilson Minton. He attended public schools and graduated from Covington High School.

Minton attended Ohio State University, graduating with an Engineer of Mines degree in ceramics engineering and mining in 1905. While there, he was a founding member of Beta Pi Kappa professional fraternity, later known as Keramos.

== Career ==
Minton worked as a ceramics chemist at the Mozaic Tile Company in Zanesville, Ohio, from 1904 to 1906. He became a ceramic engineer with the Atlantic Terra Cotta Company in Perth Amboy, New Jersey from 1906 to 1913. He made important contributions in developing color terracotta. He was the superintendent of the Wilkes-Barre Terra Cotta Co. from 1913 to 1914.

In 1914, Minton became superintendent of General Ceramics Company Plant 2 in Metuchen, New Jersey. He oversaw the manufacture of sanitary ware. He was the company's general superintendent and member of its board of directors from 1922 to 1927.

Minton was president of the American Ceramic Society from 1920 to 1921, served on its board of directors from 1917 to 1921, and was chairman of its publications committee from 1923 to 1927. He helped the American Ceramics Society transition from a scholastic organization into an industrial society. In 1930, he was a charter fellow in the American Ceramic Society.

Minton was president of the New Jersey Clay Workers' Association. In this capacity, he helped establish the Department of Ceramics at Rutgers University, incluidng going to the Governor of New Jersey and the New Jersey Legislature to convince them of the value of the program. He spoke at the dedication of the new ceramics building at Rutgers College on June 13, 1922.

In 1928, Minton became a consulting engineer with an office in Metuchen. He was a nationally known authority on ceramics. He was a director and vice president of the American Shaw Gas Kiln Company and the Seal Joint Company. He also served as president of the Metuchen Chamber of Commerce in 1925.

== Personal life ==
Minton married Grace M. Clapp of Covington, Ohio on June 1, 1904. They had three chidlren: Leroy Minton Jr., Vivian Minton, and Betty Minton. Their home in Metuchen was at 187 Amboy Avenue.

He was a member of the Mt. Zion Lodge of the Free and Accepted Masons, the Rotary Club, and the Metuchen Lodge 1673 of the Royal Arcanum. He was also a member of the Metuchen Garden Club and the Ohio Society of New York. In 1910, he was elected the associate superintendent of the Sunday School of the Perth Amboy Presbyterian Church. He was a Republican and served on the publicity committee of the Middlesex County Republican Committee. In 1924, he unsuccessfully ran for a position on the Metuchen School Board.

Minton died in his home in Metuchen of a cerebral hemorrhage on December 16, 1931, at the age of 49. He was buried with a Masonic service at the Hillside Cemetery in Metuchen, New Jersey.
