= Clara Rivero-Baleine =

Cuban-American materials scientist and optical engineer

Clara A. Rivero-Baleine is a Cuban-American materials scientist and optical engineer, known for her work on optical metamaterials in the infrared spectral range, optical coatings, and gradient-index optics. She is a Lockheed Martin Fellow at Lockheed Martin Missiles and Fire Control, and an affiliate of the Glass Processing and Characterization Lab headed by Kathleen A. Richardson at the University of Central Florida.

== Early life, education, and career ==
Rivero-Baleine's grandfather was a Cuban counter-revolutionary; her mother was a mathematics teacher. She came to the United States at age 16, with her mother and brother, as refugees from Cuba. The family settled in Orlando, Florida, and she became a student at William R. Boone High School. Because Rivero-Baleine had no English when she arrived, she needed special permission to take high school physics. Nevertheless, she graduated in 1999 as the valedictorian of her high school, and then studied physics and optics as an undergraduate at the University of Central Florida.

After completing her bachelor's degree in 2001 and receiving a master's degree in 2003, she went on to complete a Ph.D. in optics at the University of Central Florida, in 2005, with a second doctorate in materials science earned concurrently through the University of Bordeaux. Her dissertation for both doctorates, High Gain / Broadband Oxide Glasses For Next Generation Raman Amplifiers, was jointly supervised by Kathleen A. Richardson and George I. Stegeman at the University of Central Florida, and by Thierry Cardinal and Evelyne Fargin at the University of Bordeaux. She joined Lockheed Martin in the same year.

== Recognition ==
The University of Central Florida College of Optics and Photonics (CREOL) gave Rivero-Baleine their 2019 Distinguished Alumni Award.

Along with multiple internal honors from Lockheed Martin, Rivero-Baleine was inducted into the Florida Inventors Hall of Fame in 2026. She was elected as an Optica Fellow, in the 2027 class of fellows, "for achievements in optics and photonics, particularly serving as a bridge between industry and academia in the areas of metamaterials and gradient refractive index (GRIN)".
