= Covington, Ohio =

- Village
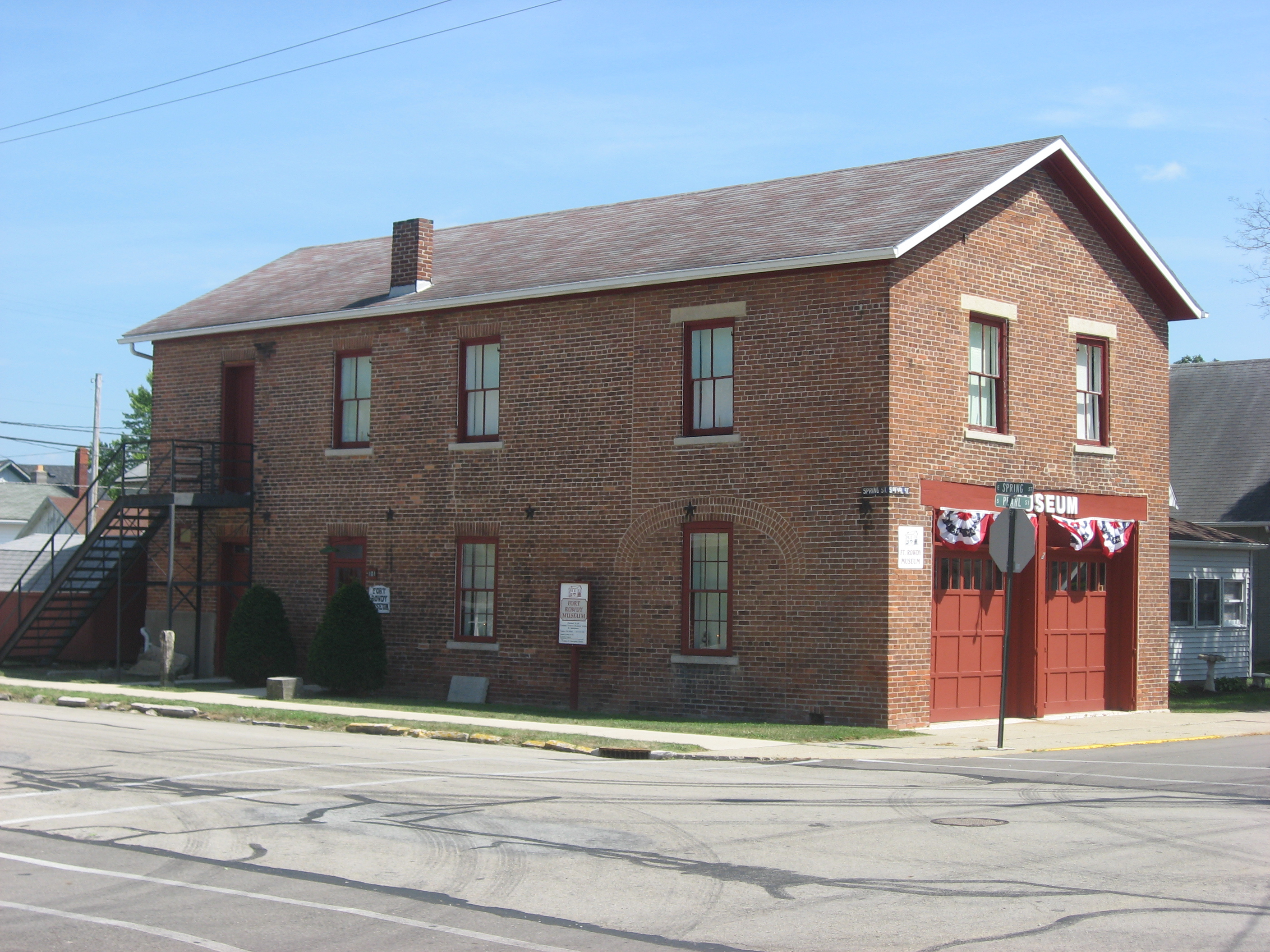
- Covington's old village hall, now a museum

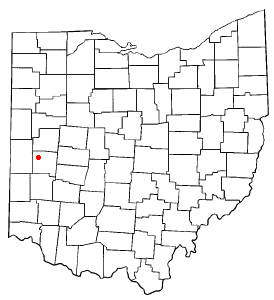
- Location of Covington, Ohio

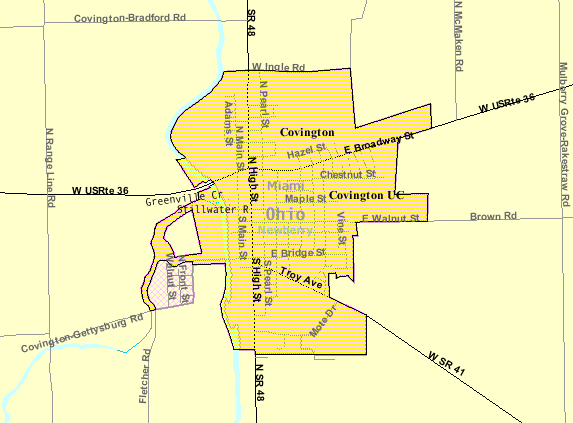
- Detailed map of Covington
- Coordinates: 40°07′20″N 84°21′05″W
- Country: United States
- State: Ohio
- County: Miami
- Township: Newberry

Area
  - Total: 1.40 sq mi (3.62 km^{2})
  - Land: 1.37 sq mi (3.55 km^{2})
  - Water: 0.027 sq mi (0.07 km^{2})
- Elevation: 929 ft (283 m)

Population (2020)
  - Total: 2,548
  - Estimate (2023): 2,598
  - Density: 1,859.0/sq mi (717.78/km^{2})
- Time zone: UTC-5 (Eastern (EST))
  - Summer (DST): UTC-4 (EDT)
- ZIP code: 45318
- Area codes: 937, 326
- FIPS code: 39-19050
- GNIS feature ID: 2398638
- Website: https://villageofcovington.com/

Covington is a village in Miami County, Ohio, United States. The population was 2,548 at the 2020 census. It is part of the Dayton Metropolitan Statistical Area. The village was incorporated as Covington in 1835 on the site of the 1793 Fort Rowdy.

== History ==
Covington was laid out in 1816. Early variant names were Friendship, Newberry, and Stillwater. A post office called Stillwater was established in 1825, and the name was changed to Covington in 1836.

The area experienced a total solar eclipse on April 8, 2024.

== Geography ==
According to the United States Census Bureau, the village has a total area of 1.35 square miles (3.50 km^{2}), of which 1.32 square miles (3.42 km^{2}) is land and 0.03 square miles (0.08 km^{2}) is water. Portions of the west border follow along the Stillwater River and Greenville Creek.

== Demographics ==
Historical population
Census	Pop.	Note	%±
1870	1,010		—
1880	1,458		44.4%
1890	1,778		21.9%
1900	1,791		0.7%
1910	1,848		3.2%
1920	1,885		2.0%
1930	1,807		−4.1%
1940	1,945		7.6%
1950	2,172		11.7%
1960	2,473		13.9%
1970	2,575		4.1%
1980	2,610		1.4%
1990	2,603		−0.3%
2000	2,559		−1.7%
2010	2,584		1.0%
2020	2,548		−1.4%
2023 (est.)	2,598	▲	2.0%
U.S. Decennial Census

=== 2010 census ===
As of the census of 2010, there were 2,584 people, 1,037 households, and 706 families living in the village. The population density was 1,957.6 inhabitants per square mile (755.8/km^{2}). There were 1,156 housing units at an average density of 875.8 per square mile (338.1/km^{2}). The racial makeup of the village was 98.1% White, 0.3% African American, 0.1% Native American, 0.2% from other races, and 1.3% from two or more races. Hispanic or Latino of any race were 0.6% of the population.

There were 1,037 households, of which 33.7% had children under the age of 18 living with them, 48.8% were married couples living together, 14.6% had a female householder with no husband present, 4.7% had a male householder with no wife present, and 31.9% were non-families. 26.8% of all households were made up of individuals, and 11.7% had someone living alone who was 65 years of age or older. The average household size was 2.42 and the average family size was 2.93.

The median age in the village was 38.7 years. 24.9% of residents were under the age of 18; 7.7% were between the ages of 18 and 24; 25.1% were from 25 to 44; 23.3% were from 45 to 64; and 18.9% were 65 years of age or older. The gender makeup of the village was 48.3% male and 51.7% female.

=== 2000 census ===
As of the census of 2000, there were 2,559 people, 1,011 households, and 702 families living in the village. The population density was 2,220.9 inhabitants per square mile (857.5/km^{2}). There were 1,075 housing units at an average density of 933.0 per square mile (360.2/km^{2}). The racial makeup of the village was 98.79% White, 0.16% African American, 0.04% Asian, 0.43% from other races, and 0.59% from two or more races. Hispanic or Latino of any race were 0.90% of the population.

There were 1,011 households, out of which 30.6% had children under the age of 18 living with them, 56.2% were married couples living together, 9.7% had a female householder with no husband present, and 30.5% were non-families. 26.5% of all households were made up of individuals, and 12.9% had someone living alone who was 65 years of age or older. The average household size was 2.44 and the average family size was 2.93.

In the village, the population was spread out, with 23.9% under the age of 18, 8.2% from 18 to 24, 28.2% from 25 to 44, 21.9% from 45 to 64, and 17.7% who were 65 years of age or older. The median age was 38 years. For every 100 females there were 90.5 males. For every 100 females age 18 and over, there were 84.0 males.

The median income for a household in the village was $41,042, and the median income for a family was $44,924. Males had a median income of $32,750 versus $24,387 for females. The per capita income for the village was $18,888. About 1.0% of families and 2.6% of the population were below the poverty line, including none of those under age 18 and 3.6% of those age 65 or over.

== Education ==
Covington is served by the Covington Exempted Village School District, which includes Covington High School.

== Notable people ==
- LeRoy H. Minton, ceramics engineer
