= Dana G. Goski =

Canadian-born materials scientist (born 1967)

Dana Goski
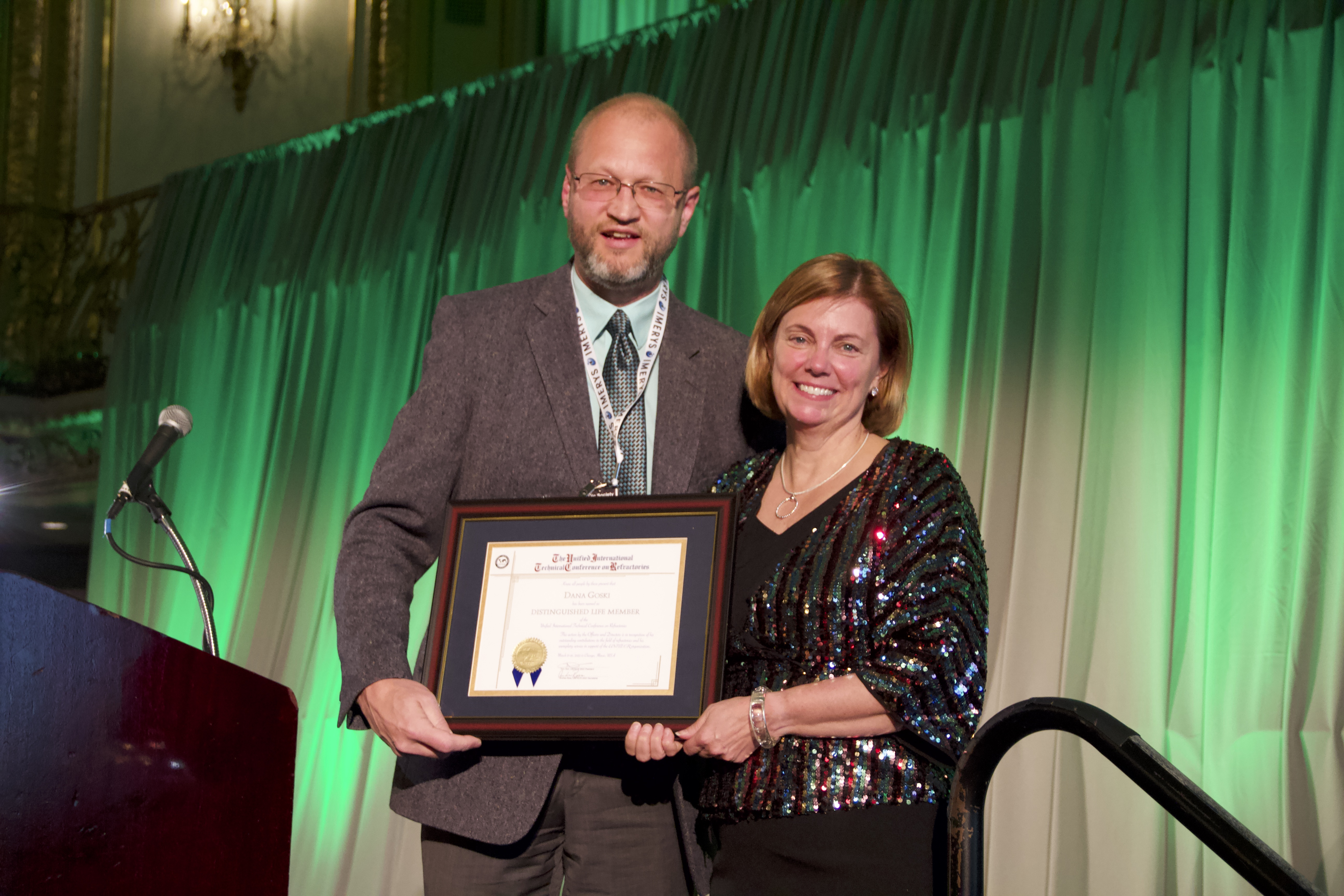
- Dana Goski, right, accepts her certificate from UNITECR 2022 president Tom Vert announcing her as the first woman UNITECR Distinguished Life Member. Taken during UNITECR 2022 in Chicago, Ill., March 2022.
- Born: Dana Grace Goski; 1967 (age 58–59); Nova Scotia, Canada
- Education: Dalhousie University
- Spouse: Keith Souchereau
- Scientific career
- Workplaces: Allied Mineral Products
- Thesis: Development of an alumina-mullite composite by reaction sintering (1997)

Dana Grace Goski (born 1967) is a Canadian-born materials scientist, past president (October 2020–October 2021) of The American Ceramic Society (ACerS), and vice president of research & development at Allied Mineral Products, Inc. During her tenure as ACerS president, she extensively supported the mission and activities of the Society's Diversity & Inclusion Subcommittee and the International Ceramic Arts Network (ICAN), the Society's member organization for clay artisans and potters.

== Education ==
Goski was born in Nova Scotia, Canada. She received her early education at Royal Canadian Air Force Base schools and finished high school in the Nova Scotia public school system. After graduation, she studied chemistry at Dalhousie University in Nova Scotia where she received her B.Sc. in 1989 and M.Sc. in 1992 as a joint project with the National Research Council of Canada (NRC) with a focus on colloidal processing and surface chemistry of alumina and zirconia systems. In 1997, she completed her Ph.D. at the Technical University of Nova Scotia and published her thesis Development of an alumina-mullite composite by reaction sintering.

== Career ==
In 1996, Goski moved to Columbus, Ohio, to join Allied Mineral Products, a global producer of monolithic refractory materials, as a senior research engineer and technical consultant. In 2009, she was named director of research and development before becoming vice president of research and development in 2018 at Allied, where she guides research in advanced ceramic composites and refractory materials.

Goski was named a Fellow of The American Ceramic Society in 2015, awarded the St. Louis Section Theodore J. Planje Award in 2019, and the Marquis Award in 2020.

== Awards and recognition ==
- Her patented work on monolithic graphitic castable was recognized with the 2015 ACerS Corporate Technical Achievement Award, given to the Allied Mineral Products team in relation to Goski's patent. In 2019, she was recognized with the Theodore J. Planje Award, given for distinguished achievement in the field of refractories, by the St. Louis Section of ACerS.
  - For her support of leadership priorities, identification of strategic approaches, and ability to rally people together to achieve significant milestones, she was honored with the ACerS Global Ambassador Award (2019). In 2020, Goski was awarded with the John Marquis Memorial Award for her work published in ACerS journals and related to manufacturing in ceramics and glass.
- 2015 Fellow of The American Ceramic Society
- 2015 ACerS Corporate Technical Achievement Award
- 2019 Theodore J. Planje Award
- 2019 ACerS Global Ambassador Award
- 2020 John Marquis Memorial Award
- 2020–2021 President of The American Ceramic Society
- 2022 First woman designated as a Distinguished Life Member of the Unified International Technical Conference on Refractories (UNITECR)
