= Lauren Rohwer =

American scientist

- Education: University of Massachusetts Amherst (B.S.); Virginia Tech (M.S.); University of California, San Diego (Ph.D.)
- Scientific career
- Fields: Materials science
- Workplaces: Sandia National Laboratories
- Thesis: Development of efficient, small particle size luminescent oxides using combustion synthesis (1997)
- Doctoral advisor: Joanna McKittrick

Lauren Elizabeth Shea Rohwer is an American scientist. She is a principal member of the technical staff at Sandia National Laboratories. Rohwer researches synthesis and characterization of nanoscale luminescent materials with applications to solid-state lighting.

== Education ==
Rohwer completed a bachelor of science in physics from University of Massachusetts Amherst in 1990. In 1993, she earned a master of science in materials science and engineering from Virginia Tech. She completed a Ph.D. in materials science from University of California, San Diego (UCSD) in 1997. At UCSD she pioneered the use of combustion synthesis for producing efficient, small particle size oxide phosphors. Rohwer's dissertation was titled Development of efficient, small particle size luminescent oxides using combustion synthesis. Her advisor was Joanna McKittrick. Rohwer credits her professor, Mark Philips for giving her the opportunity to work as a student intern the summers of 1995 and 1996 at Sandia National Laboratories. She acknowledges Sandia personnel Robert Walko, Robert Mays, and Esther Sluzky for use of their cathodoluminescence characterization facilities. Gustaf Arrhenius, Karen Kavanagh, M. L. Rudee, Jan B. Talbot, and Mark Phillips served on her doctoral committee.

== Career ==
She joined Sandia National Laboratories on a limited term basis from April 1997 to June 1998 when she became a member of the technical staff. She is currently a principal member of the technical staff. Rohwer served as Chair of the Luminescence and Display Materials Division of the Electrochemical Society. She is co-editor of the Handbook of Luminescence Display Materials, and Devices, American Scientific Publishers. She has authored or co-authored over thirty publications and one U.S. Patent.

=== Research ===
Rohwer's research interests include the synthesis and characterization of nanoscale luminescent materials with applications to solid-state lighting (SSL). In 1997, she began studying the low-voltage cathodoluminescence (CL) of display phosphors. This work led to the development of a measurement standard for CL luminous efficiency of phosphor powders and films. She partnered with GE Global Research to study the quantum splitting of Pr^{3+} ions in oxide hosts for mercury-free fluorescent lighting Her interest in nanoscale luminescent materials began with studies of II-VI semiconductor quantum dots (QDs) for SSL, leading to the first demonstration of solid-state light sources based on encapsulated CdS QDs. She studied the photoluminescence decay dynamics of QDs and phosphors in the time and frequency domains. Several interesting discoveries came from this work. In CdS QDs, the surface ligands strongly affect the functional form of the decay; with trap states giving rise to broadband emission and a stretched exponential decay with long characteristic lifetimes. The nonexponential decay dynamics of the complex donor-acceptor phosphor ZnS:Cu,Al are a strong function of the excitation conditions. She co-developed a 1-D model of ZnS phosphors that explains some intriguing experimental observations such as a cross-over from stretched exponential to power law decay due to the development of spatial correlations between electrons and holes. She recently completed a successful program on the development of oxide nanophosphors for SSL. This program identified three new Eu^{3+}-doped red emitters for blue LED excitation; and achieved transparent nanoparticle dispersions of phosphors such as yellow-green-emitting YAG:Ce. New luminescent phases of strontium vanadate were also discovered during the course of this program.
