= Kathleen A. Richardson =

American physicist

Kathleen Ann Cerqua-Richardson
- Born: Rochester, New York
- Education: Alfred University (BS, MS, PhD)
- Scientific career
- Workplaces: University of Central Florida; Clemson University; Naval Air Defence Laboratory; University of Rochester
- Doctoral students: Clara Rivero-Baleine

Kathleen Ann Cerqua-Richardson is an American physicist and the Pegasus Professor of Optics & Photonics, Materials Science and Engineering at the University of Central Florida. She is a Fellow of SPIE, the American Ceramic Society and The Optical Society. Her research considers the synthesis and characterisation of novel glasses and ceramic materials.

== Early life and education ==
Richardson was born in Rochester, New York. Her parents were both self-employed, and she was supported by scholarships to attend college. At the time Kodak was based in Rochester, and Richardson grew up thinking that she might work in optics. As a child she took part in a boy scouts explorer club in optics that met every week at Kodak Park. Richardson studied ceramic engineering at New York State College of Ceramics at Alfred University. After earning her bachelor's degree in 1982 she joined the University of Rochester Laboratory for Laser Energetics where she spent four years as an optical engineer. She returned to Alfred University for her graduate studies. Richardson started lecturing at Alfred University immediately after completing her master's degree. She earned her doctorate in 1992, and joined the Naval Air Defence Laboratory in California.

== Research and career ==
When Richardson realised that the Naval Air Defence Laboratory did not have the facilities to support her research work, she moved to the University of Central Florida College of Optics and Photonics. Richardson works on the science of optical glass, and novel materials for gradient refractive index optics. She moved to Clemson University as Director of Materials Science and Engineering in 2004, before returning to the University of Central Florida in 2012. In 2014 Richardson was made president of the American Ceramic Society.

The citation for her SPIE Maria J. Yzuel Outstanding Educator Award read, “education has been an integral part of Kathleen Richardson's professional career from the beginning, starting with her own PhD time ... She started lecturing at Alfred University immediately after finishing her master's degree and, soon after that, began teaching her short course series for SPIE and other international meetings and summer schools ... Throughout her career she has demonstrated a passion for optics education and has been a leader and role model in that arena,”.

== Awards and honours ==
- 2008 Elected Fellow of SPIE
- 2010 Elected Fellow of The Optical Society
- 2017 European Ceramic Society Sir Richard Brooks International Award
- 2017 American Ceramic Society George W. Morey award
- 2017 Rutgers University Malcolm G. McClaren Distinguished Award
- 2019 American Ceramic Society Arthur L. Friedberg Award
- 2019 Elected Fellow of the European Ceramic Society
- 2020 American Ceramic Society Greaves-Walker Award
- 2020 SPIE Maria J. Yzuel Outstanding Educator Award

== Selected publications ==
- Eggleton, Benjamin J.; Luther-Davies, Barry; Richardson, Kathleen (2011). "Chalcogenide photonics". Nature Photonics. 5 (3): 141–148. Bibcode:2011NaPho...5..141E. doi:10.1038/nphoton.2011.309. ISSN 1749-4893.
- Efimov, Oleg M.; Glebov, Leonid B.; Glebova, Larissa N.; Richardson, Kathleen C.; Smirnov, Vadim I. (1999-02-01). "High-efficiency Bragg gratings in photothermorefractive glass". Applied Optics. 38 (4): 619–627. Bibcode:1999ApOpt..38..619E. doi:10.1364/AO.38.000619. ISSN 2155-3165. PMID 18305654.
- Cardinal, T; Richardson, K. A; Shim, H; Schulte, A; Beatty, R; Le Foulgoc, K; Meneghini, C; Viens, J. F; Villeneuve, A (1999-10-02). "Non-linear optical properties of chalcogenide glasses in the system As–S–Se". Journal of Non-Crystalline Solids. 256–257: 353–360. Bibcode:1999JNCS..256..353C. doi:10.1016/S0022-3093(99)00524-4. ISSN 0022-3093.

== Personal life ==
Richardson is married with two children.
