= Elizabeth Dickey =

American materials scientist

Elizabeth Carol Dickey
- Education: University of Kentucky; Northwestern University
- Scientific career
- Workplaces: North Carolina State University; Carnegie Mellon University
- Thesis: Interface structure and interfacial phenomena in nickel oxide-cubic zirconia directionally solidified eutectics (1997)

Elizabeth Carol Dickey is an American materials scientist who is the Teddy and Wilton Hawkins Distinguished Professor at Carnegie Mellon University. Her research considers structure-property relationships for materials with grain boundaries and interfaces. She is a Fellow of the American Association for the Advancement of Science, the American Ceramic Society and the Microscopy Society of America.

== Early life and education ==
Dickey was an undergraduate student at the University of Kentucky, where she studied materials science. She moved to Northwestern University as a doctoral researcher, where she studied nickel oxide cubic zirconia.

== Research and career ==
Dickey joined Pennsylvania State University in 2002, where she worked as associate director of the interdisciplinary Materials Research Institute and Director of the Materials Characterization Laboratory. In 2011, she was made professor at North Carolina State University where she oversaw the reorganization of the Analytical Instrumentation Facility and established the Center for Dielectrics and Piezoelectrics.

Dickey looks to identify processing-structure-property relationships for ceramics and systems with grain boundaries and interfaces. The complex chemistry of grain boundaries in materials can impact electrical and chemical transport. She combines advanced characterization techniques, e.g. electron microscopy, infrared spectroscopy and ellipsometry, to understand the functional properties of materials.

Dickey was elected President of the American Ceramic Society in 2021. That year she was made Head of the Department of Materials Science and Engineering at Carnegie Mellon University.

== Awards and honors ==
- Presidential Early Career Award for Scientists and Engineers
- Academician of the World Academy of Ceramics
- 2010 Fellow of the American Ceramic Society
- 2012 American Ceramic Society Richard M. Fulrath Award
- 2013 Northwestern University Early Career Achievement Award
- 2020 Fellow of American Association for the Advancement of Science
- 2020 Fellow of the Microscopy Society of America
- 2020 NCSU Alumni Association Distinguished Graduate Professorship
- 2023 American Ceramic Society Robert B. Sosman Award and Lecture

== Selected publications ==
- Christina M Rost; Edward Sachet; Trent Borman; et al. (29 September 2015). "Entropy-stabilized oxides". Nature Communications. 6: 8485. Bibcode:2015NatCo...6.8485R. doi:10.1038/ncomms9485. ISSN 2041-1723. PMC 4598836. PMID 26415623. Wikidata Q36139299.
- R. Andrews; D. Jacques; A.M. Rao; F. Derbyshire; D. Qian; X. Fan; E.C. Dickey; J. Chen (April 1999). "Continuous production of aligned carbon nanotubes: a step closer to commercial realization". Chemical Physics Letters. 303 (5–6): 467–474. doi:10.1016/s0009-2614(99)00282-1. ISSN 0009-2614. Wikidata Q59665124.
- Oomman K. Varghese; Dawei Gong; Maggie Paulose; Craig A. Grimes; Elizabeth C. Dickey (January 2003). "Crystallization and high-temperature structural stability of titanium oxide nanotube arrays". Journal of Materials Research. 18 (1): 156–165. doi:10.1557/jmr.2003.0022. ISSN 0884-2914. Wikidata Q118165277.
