= John W. Whittemore =

American academic and engineer (1897–1963)

- Born: John Weed Whittemore; September 27, 1897; Sioux City, Iowa, U.S.
- Died: April 13, 1963 (aged 65); Blacksburg, Virginia, U.S.
- Occupations: Academic and ceramic engineer

Academic background
- Education: Morningside College; Iowa State College

Academic work
- Discipline: Ceramic engineering
- Institutions: Louisiana State University; Virginia Agricultural and Mechanical College and Polytechnic Institute

John Weed Whittemore (September 27, 1897 – April 13, 1963) was an American academic and ceramic engineer. He helped establish the ceramic engineering departments at Louisiana State University and Virginia Tech. He was dean of the School of Engineering and Architecture and director of the Engineering Extension Station at Virginia Tech, where he worked from 1926 to 1962. Whittemore was a fellow and president of the American Ceramic Society.

== Early life ==
Whittemore was born in Sioux City, Iowa on September 27, 1897. His father, J. H. Whittemore, was the finance commissioner of Sioux City and operated a creamery business. He attended primary school in Sioux City and graduated from Sioux City High School in 1916.

He attended Morningside College in Sioux City from 1916 to 1917. During World War I, Whittemore was a member of the Student Army Training Corps at Iowa State College and was selected for field artillary officer's training school at Camp Zachary Taylor in Kentucky.

Whittemore attended Iowa State College, graduating with a B.S. in ceramic engineering in 1921 and a professional certificate in engineering in 1927. He was a founding member of the Sioux City chapter of the American Business Club on August 12, 1925.

== Career ==
Whittemore became a construction engineer with O. J. Whittemore Sr. in 1921. O.J. Whittemore Sr. was his older brother and the first registered ceramic eningeer in Iowa and head of the ceramic engineering department of Iowa State College while John studied there.

Next, Whittemore worked for the Sioux City Brick Co. as a foreman in 1921 and a superintendent from 1922 to 1926. He worked as a ceramic engineer with the minerals division of the Louisiana Department of Conservation from 1926 to 1928. At the same time, he was an associate professor of geology and organized and was chair of the Department of Ceramic Engineering at Louisiana State University.

Whittemore became professional certified engineer in 1927; he was the first registered ceramic engineer in Virginia. He helped with restoration efforts at Colonial Williamsburg.

Whittemore established and became a professor and the head of the Department of Ceramic Engineering at Virginia Agricultural and Mechanical College and Polytechnic Institute from November 1928 to 1952. He was promoted to associate dean from 1943 to 1952, and then dean of the School of Engineering and Architecture from November 10, 1952 to 1963. Under his leadership, enrollment in the school grew from 1,487 to nearly 3,200. Whittemore was also the director of the Engineering Extension Station at Virginia Tech. He worked at Virginia Tech from November 1928 until his retirement on February 1, 1963.

During World War II, Whittemore was a ceramics technical advisor and consultant for the Foreign Economic Administration in Germany. He also directed the United States Army's specialized training program at Virginia Tech. He also worked part-time with the engineering department of E. I. duPont de Nemours Co. in Wilmington, Delaware from 1951 to 1952, as part of the Year-in-Industry.

Whittemore was the president and vice president of the American Ceramic Society. He was also chairman of the society's Structural Clay Products Division, the Whitewares Division, and chairman of the Committee on Standards. He was a founder, secretary, vice president, and president of the National Institute of Ceramic Engineers. He was also a member of the Society for the Promotion of Engineering Education and American Society for Testing Materials, serving as the chairman of the latter's committee on manufacturered units from 1948 to sometime after 1961.

== Honors ==
Whittemore was a fellow in the American Ceramic Society. He was a member of Omicron Delta Kappa, Sigma Xi, and Tau Beta Pi honor societies.

He received the Award of Merit from the American Society of Testing Materials on June 28, 1961. Whittemore received an honorary Doctor of Science from Alfred University in 1955.

Alumni established the John W. Whittemore Scholarship at Virginia Tech and presented Whittemore's portrait to the university. Whittemore Hall at Virginia Tech was named in his honor in 1968 and was dedicated in October 1972. Whittemore's papers are archived at Virginia Tech.

== Personal life ==
Whittemore married Clifford Kelly in New Orleans, Louisiana in September 1926. She was from Baton Rouge, Louisiana. They had two daughters: Mary Ann Whittemore and Joan Whittemore.

Whittemore became an honorary member of the North Carolina State University chapter of Keramos fraternity in 1935. He served as the Virginia subchapter's representative to the fraternity's executive council from 1935 to 1940. In 1940, he helped establish the Virginia chapter of Keramos at Virginia Tech and served as the chapter's faculty advisor from 1940 to 1948. He was also a member of the Masons.

Whittemore died in Blacksburg, Virginia, on April 13, 1963.
