= Joseph Eldrid Burke =

American electrical engineer (1914-2000)

- Born: 1 September 1914; Berkeley, California
- Died: 29 February 2000 (aged 85); Schenectady, New York
- Education: Cornell University
- Occupations: metallurgist and material scientist
- Scientific career
- Fields: Materials Science
- Workplaces: Los Alamos National Laboratory

Joseph Eldrid Burke (1 September 1914 – 29 February 2000) was an American metallurgist and material scientist who specialized in ceramics.

== Life ==
Burke was born on September 1, 1914, in Berkeley, California to Charles Eldrid and Ruth Enid Burke. He was married two times, first to Kathleen Mary Wilson and for a second time to Marjorie Ridgway Burke. He died in Schenectady, New York on February 29, 2000.

== Education ==
In 1938, he graduated from the McMaster University, located in Canada. He completed his Ph.D. in ceramic science at Cornell University in 1940.

== Career ==
He worked for the International Nickel Company and the Norton Company.

During World War II, he worked at Los Alamos National Laboratory, where he helped design, build, and manage a new systematic process for the preparation of plutonium nitrate and its conversion to bomb cores.

== Awards and honours ==
Burke was elected to the National Academy of Engineering in 1976. He was a member, past president (1974), and Distinguished Life Member (1982) of The American Ceramic Society.

== Bibliography ==
He is the author of a number of notable books:

- Grain Control in Industrial Metallurgy
- Procedures in Experimental Metallurgy
- Precipitation and Spontaneous Recrystallization in Tin-bismuth Alloys
- Recollections of Wartime Los Alamos

== See also ==
- Manhattan Project
