= Johnny Townsend (American football) =

American football player (born 1995)

No. 5, 6, 8
- Position: Punter

Personal information
- Born: February 14, 1995 (age 31); Leoti, Kansas, U.S.
- Listed height: 6 ft 1 in (1.85 m)
- Listed weight: 205 lb (93 kg)

Career information
- High school: Boone (Orlando, Florida)
- College: Florida
- NFL draft: 2018: 5th round, 173rd overall pick

Career history
- Oakland Raiders (2018); New York Giants (2019)*; Baltimore Ravens (2020)*; Kansas City Chiefs (2020)*; Baltimore Ravens (2020–2021); Tennessee Titans (2021); Houston Texans (2021)*; Kansas City Chiefs (2021); Orlando Guardians (2023)
- * Offseason or practice squad member only

Awards and highlights
- Second-team All-American (2016); First-team All-SEC (2017); 2× Second-team All-SEC (2015, 2016)

Career NFL statistics
- Punts: 83
- Punting yards: 3,587
- Average punt: 43.2
- Stats at Pro Football Reference

Johnny Townsend (born February 14, 1995) is an American former professional football player who was a punter in the National Football League (NFL). He played college football for the Florida Gators. He was selected by the Oakland Raiders in the fifth round of the 2018 NFL draft. His younger brother Tommy is a punter on the Tennessee Titans active roster.

== Early life ==
Townsend played at William R. Boone High School in Orlando. He and his brother were coached by kicking guru, Toby Peabody, though neither were punters under his tutelage. He was initially recruited by Ohio State.

== College career ==
Townsend had the highest Football Bowl Subdivision (FBS) punting average in the country in 2016, with a 47.9 yard average. With this average, he also set the all-time punting record for the Florida Gators. Townsend held the FBS record for highest career average yards per punt until 2021, when it was broken by Colorado State punter Ryan Stonehouse.

== Professional career ==
Pre-draft measurables
Height	Weight	Arm length	Hand span
6 ft 1 in (1.85 m)	210 lb (95 kg)	30 5/8 in (0.78 m)	9 1/2 in (0.24 m)
All values from NFL Combine

=== Oakland Raiders ===
Townsend was selected by the Oakland Raiders in the fifth round (173rd overall) of the 2018 NFL draft. The pick used to draft him was acquired from the Dallas Cowboys in exchange for Jamize Olawale. He made his NFL debut in the Raiders' season opener against the Los Angeles Rams. He had four punts for 178 net yards in the 33–13 loss. In Week 10, against the Los Angeles Chargers, he executed a 42-yard rush on a fake punt. He totaled 70 punts for 3,022 net yards for a 43.17 average in his rookie season. He was waived by the Raiders on August 13, 2019.

=== New York Giants ===
On August 14, 2019, Townsend was claimed off waivers by the New York Giants. He was waived on August 31, 2019.

=== Baltimore Ravens (first stint) ===
After sitting out the 2019 NFL season, Townsend had tryouts with the Baltimore Ravens on August 18 and 22, 2020. He signed with the team on August 25, 2020. He was waived on September 5, 2020.

=== Kansas City Chiefs (first stint) ===
Townsend was signed to the practice squad of the Kansas City Chiefs on November 17, 2020, joining his brother Tommy who was on their active roster.

=== Baltimore Ravens (second stint) ===
Townsend was signed by the Baltimore Ravens off the Chiefs' practice squad on December 31, 2020, after punter Sam Koch was placed on the reserve/COVID-19 list.

On August 17, 2021, Townsend was waived by the Ravens and re-signed to the practice squad on September 1, 2021 He was released from the practice squad on September 21, 2021.

=== Tennessee Titans ===
Townsend signed with the Tennessee Titans on September 30, 2021. He was waived on October 19, 2021.

=== Houston Texans ===
On October 30, 2021, Townsend was signed to the Houston Texans practice squad. On November 2, 2021, Townsend was released by the Texans.

=== Kansas City Chiefs (second stint) ===
Townsend was signed to the Kansas City Chiefs practice squad on December 23, 2021. Following his brother, Tommy, the Chiefs' usual punter, testing positive for COVID-19, he was elevated via a standard elevation for the Chiefs' week 16 game against the Pittsburgh Steelers. He reverted back to the practice squad after the game, and later was released on December 28.

=== Orlando Guardians ===
Townsend joined the Orlando Guardians of the XFL in February 2023. The Guardians folded when the XFL and United States Football League merged to create the United Football League (UFL).
