= Glassphalt =

Construction material

Glassphalt or glasphalt (a portmanteau of glass and asphalt) is a variety of asphalt that uses crushed glass. It has been used as an alternative to conventional bituminous asphalt pavement since the early 1970s. Glassphalt must be properly mixed and placed if it is to meet roadway pavement standards, requiring some modifications to generally accepted asphalt procedures.

Generally, there is about 10–20% glass by weight in glassphalt.
