= Journal of the American Ceramic Society =

- Discipline: Materials science, ceramics
- Language: English
- Edited by: John C. Mauro

Publication details
- Former names: Transactions of the American Ceramic Society, Advanced Ceramic Materials
- History: 1918-present
- Publisher: Wiley-Blackwell on behalf of the American Ceramic Society
- Frequency: Monthly
- Impact factor: 3.8 (2024)

Standard abbreviations
- ISO 4: J. Am. Ceram. Soc.

Indexing
- CODEN: JACTAW
- ISSN: 0002-7820 (print); 1551-2916 (web)
- LCCN: 19016783
- OCLC no.: 1479639

Links
- Journal homepage; Online access; Online archive; Journal page at American Ceramic Society website

The Journal of the American Ceramic Society is a monthly peer-reviewed scientific journal published on behalf of the American Ceramic Society by Wiley-Blackwell. It was established in 1918 and the current editor-in-chief is John C. Mauro. Publishing formats include full length original research, communications (rapid publishing), feature articles, and review articles. The journal covers all aspects of research on ceramic materials science.

== Abstracting and indexing ==
The journal is abstracted and indexed in:

- Chemical Abstracts Service
- Current Chemical Reactions
- Current Contents/Engineering, Computing & Technology
- Current Contents/Physical, Chemical & Earth Sciences
- Reaction Citation Index
- Materials Science Citation Index
- METADEX
- Science Citation Index Expanded
- Scopus

According to the Journal Citation Reports, the journal has a 2024 impact factor of 3.8.
