= Jan B. Talbot =

American chemical engineer

- Education: Pennsylvania State University (BS, MS); University of Minnesota (PhD)
- Occupation: Chemical engineer

Jan B. Talbot is an American chemical engineer. Her work encompassed electrophoretic deposition, electrodeposition, chemical mechanical polishing, display screen processing, solid state lightning materials, material science and electrochemical transport phenomena and engineering. She is a professor emerita at the Jacobs School of Engineering. She completed a bachelor and Master of Science in chemical engineering at Pennsylvania State University where she was one of seven women amongst 3000 engineering students. From 1975 to 1981, Talbot was as a development engineer at Oak Ridge National Laboratory. She earned a Ph.D. in chemical engineering and materials science in 1986 from University of Minnesota. She joined the faculty at Aiiso Yufeng Li Family Department of Chemical and Nano Engineering at the University of California, San Diego in 1986, and retired in 2018. Talbot was the first woman hired in the department and in 2003, she was the second woman to chair the Academic Senate at UCSD.

Talbot served as board vice president (1998-2001) and was the president of the Electrochemical Society from 2001 to 2002. In 2004, she became a fellow of the Electrochemical Society. Talbot also served as the editor of "Interface" from 1995-1998. To honor Talbot, the Electrochemical Society has established a sponsored collection of 48 of her articles to make them freely available.

== Publications ==
1. Talbot's work may be accessed at the Electrochemical Society site.
2. Ye, X.-R., Y. Lin, C. M. Wai, J. B. Talbot, and S. Jin, “Supercritical Fluid Attachment of Palladium Nanoparticles on Aligned Carbon ,” Journal of Nanoscience and Nanotechnology, Vol. 5, No. 7, 964-969 (July 2005).
3. Lee, J. and J. B. Talbot, “Simulation of Particle Incorporation during Electrodeposition Process: Primary and Secondary Current Distributions,” Journal of The Electrochemical Society, 152 (10), C706-C715 (2005).
4. Hurt, M., and J. B. Talbot “A Dry Phosphor Screening Method for Emissive Displays Using a Tacky Photopolymer,” Journal of The Electrochemical Society, 152 (11), H178-H182 (2005).
5. Sweet, W.S., J. B. Talbot, and R. Higgins, Electrophoretic Deposition of Zeolite 5A for Use in Supported Gas Separation Membranes," Key Engineering Materials, 314, 39-44 (2006).
6. Swei, J. and J. B. Talbot, "Development of High-Definition Aqueous Polyvinylpyrrolidone (PVP) Photoresists for CRTs, " Journal of Applied Polymer Science, 102 (2), 1637-1644 (2006).
7. Ye, X. R., C. Daraio, C. Wang, J. B. Talbot, and S. Jin, “Room Temperature Solvent-Free Synthesis of Monodisperse Magnetite Nanocrystals,” J. Nanosci. Nanotechnol. 6, 852-856 (2006).
8. Gopal. T. and J. B. Talbot, “Effects of CMP Slurry Chemistry on the Zeta Potential of Alumina Abrasives," Journal of The Electrochemical Society, 153, G622 (2006).
9. Inhfeldt, R and J.B. Talbot, “Effects of Copper CMP Slurry Chemistry on the Colloidal Behavior of Alumina Abrasives," Journal of The Electrochemical Society, 153, G948 (2006).
10. B. Han, K. Mishra, M. Raukas, K. Klinedinst, J. Tao, and J.B. Talbot, “Investigation of Luminescence from Dy3+ in AlN,” Journal of The Electrochemical Society, 154 (1), J44 –J52, 2007.
11. J. Lee, and J. B. Talbot, “A Model of Electrocodeposition on a Rotating Cylinder Electrode," Journal of The Electrochemical Society, 154 (2), D70-D77, 2007.
12. T. Gopal, and J. B. Talbot, “Use of Slurry Colloidal Behavior in Modeling of Material Removal Rates for CMP,” Journal of The Electrochemical Society, 154 (6), H507-H511, 2007.
13. S. Quale, and J. B. Talbot, “Electrophoretic Deposition of Substrate-Normal-Oriented Single-Walled Carbon Nanotube Structures”, Journal of The Electrochemical Society, 154 (8), K25-K28, 2007, also June 11, 2007, issue of Virtual Journal of Nanoscale Science & Technology.
14. S. J. Osborne, W. S. Sweet, K. S. Vecchio, and J. B. Talbot, “Electroplating of Copper-Alumina Nanocomposite Films with an Impinging Jet Electrode,” Journal of The Electrochemical Society, 154 (8), D394-D399, 2007; also June 25, 2007, issue of Virtual Journal of Nanoscale Science & Technology.
15. B. Han, M. Raukas, K. Klinedinst, J. Tao, J. B. Talbot, and K. Mishra, “A Study of Luminescence from Tm3+, Tb3+ and Eu3+ in AlN Powder,” Journal of The Electrochemical Society, 154 (9), J262 –J266, 2007.
16. D. Thiemig, J. B. Talbot and A. Bund, “Electrocodeposition of Nickel Nanocomposites using an Impinging Jet Electrode", Journal of The Electrochemical Society, 154 (10), D510-515, 2007.
17. R. Inhfeldt and J.B. Talbot, “Modeling of Copper CMP Using the Colloidal Behavior of an Alumina Slurry with Copper Nanoparticles,” Journal of The Electrochemical Society, 154 (12), H1018-H1026 (2007).
18. N. Perea-Lopez, J. H. Tao, J. McKittrick, J. B. Talbot, M. Raukas, J. Laski, K. C. Mishra, and G. Hirata, “Eu3+ Activated GaN Thin Films Grown on Sapphire by Pulsed Laser Deposition,” Physica Status Solidi C, 5, No. 6, 1756–1758 (2008).5, No. 6, 1756–1758 (20085, No. 6, 1756–1758 (2008).
19. J. H. Tao, N. Perea-Lopez, J. McKittrick, J. B. Talbot, K. Klinedinst, M. Raukas, J. Laski, K. C. Mishra, and G. Hirata, “Synthesis of Rare-earth Activated AlN and GaN Powders Via a Three-step Conversion Process,” Physica Status Solidi C, 5, No. 6, 1889–1891 (2008).
20. J. Tao, N. Perea-Lopez, J. McKittrick, J. B. Talbot, B. Han, M. Raukas, K. Klinedinst, and K. Mishra, “A Study of Oxygen Content in GaN, AlN, and GaAlN Powders," J. Electrochem. Soc., 155 (6), J137-J142 (2008).
21. R. Ihnfeldt and J. B. Talbot, “Effect of CMP Slurry Chemistry on Copper Surface Nanohardness”, J. Electrochem. Soc., 155 (6), H412-H420 (2008).
22. N. Perea-Lopez, J. Tao, J.B. Talbot, J. McKittrick, G.A. Hirata and S. P. DenBaars, “A Novel Hybrid Pulse Laser Deposition/ Metalorganic Vapour Deposition Method to Form Rare-earth Activated GaN,” J. Phys. D: Appl. Phys., 41, 122001 (2008).
