= American Ceramic Society =

Professional organization

The American Ceramic Society
- Abbreviation: ACerS
- Founded: 1898
- Type: Nonprofit, professional
- Purpose: Ceramics
- Location(s): 470 Olde Worthington Road; Suite 200; Westerville, Ohio
- Region served: Worldwide
- Method: Conferences, publications
- Key people: Mark Mecklenborg, executive director
- Website: https://ceramics.org

The American Ceramic Society (ACerS) is a nonprofit organization for professionals in the ceramics and glass community, with a focus on scientific research, emerging technologies, and applications in which ceramic materials are an element. ACerS is located in Westerville, Ohio.

ACerS members are engineers, scientists, researchers, manufacturers, plant personnel, educators, students, and marketing and sales representatives. Approximately 35% of the Society’s members reside outside the United States. The society has been in existence close to 120 years and was founded in 1898.

== Journals ==
As of 2019, ACerS publishes four peer-reviewed journals:

Journal of the American Ceramic Society (JACerS)

International Journal of Applied Ceramic Technology (ACT)

International Journal of Applied Glass Science (IJAGS)

International Journal of Ceramic Engineering & Science (IJCES)

== History ==
=== Creation (1898–1899) ===
At the dawn of the 20^{th} century, amidst the rapid industrialization of the United States, the importance of ceramics in technological advancements was becoming increasingly apparent. In response to this need, ACerS was formed with the dedication to promoting scientific research, technical advancements, and the practical applications of ceramic materials.

The genesis of ACerS took place at the February 1898 meeting of the National Brick Manufacturers’ Association in Pittsburgh, Pa. Elmer E. Gorton of American Terra Cotta & Ceramic Co. presented a paper entitled “Experimental Work, Wise and Otherwise.” This presentation was significant for being the first paper presented at the convention with a scientific focus, and it motivated the formation of a noncommercial society dedicated to the exchange of ideas and research on the science of ceramics. The organizational meeting to form this new society was held Feb. 6, 1899, in Orton Hall on the Ohio State University campus in Columbus, Ohio. But it was not until the first summer excursion meeting in July 1899 that the group settled on The American Ceramic Society as the official name.

The Society’s initial meetings and conventions were centered primarily on the production of traditional ceramics, such as pottery, structural clay, and refractories, which were thriving industries in Ohio and neighboring states at the time. Presentations at these meetings addressed the challenges faced by manufacturers and researchers alike. This focus expanded over time to include more advanced and diverse topics such as optical glass, electronic materials, and bioceramics.

=== Growth and expansion (1900–1945) ===
After its establishment, ACerS underwent considerable growth in membership, publications, and influence.

During its first decade of existence, the Society required new members to apply for admission based on fairly rigid standards for education and technological achievements. Even so, by the seventh annual meeting in 1905, ACerS had 166 members and included one foreign member (William H. Zimmer of Coburg, Germany). In 1910, a contributing member class was established for companies that wished to participate in the Society’s efforts (now known as the Corporate Partnership program), and in 1915, U.S. Sections were established to unite members locally in different parts of the country.

By 1918, ACerS consisted of nearly 1,000 individual members, and Society leadership recognized the need for specialization to effectively meet the needs of all members. The 21^{st} annual meeting saw the creation of Divisions based on research focus and application, and these Divisions grew and evolved over the succeeding decades to account for changing and novel fields of study.

Making ceramic literature accessible to members and ceramists globally is a key goal of ACerS. Among the Society’s first acts in 1900 was the authorization of two big publishing ventures: the creation of an 80-page pamphlet titled The Manual of Ceramic Calculation and an English translation of the collected writings of Hermann Seger. Producing books can take years, however, so ACerS also published an annual journal called Transactions of the American Ceramic Society to present timely coverage of new research studies and scientific news. By 1918, the annual Transactions had reached a size of unwieldy proportions, so Society leadership decided to publish the journal monthly instead and rename it Journal of the American Ceramic Society, which remains one of the most respected journals in the ceramics field.

In 1931, the National Brick Manufacturers' Association, which was the association where the foundations for ACerS were created at their national meeting in 1898, merged with the ACerS Heavy Clay Products Division to form the Structural Clay Products Division.

=== War efforts ===
Both World War I and World War II took place during this time, and ACerS members contributed significantly to the war efforts by supporting the development of advanced ceramic materials for military applications, including radar technology, ceramic armor, heat-resistant components for aircraft and rockets, and even crucibles for the Manhattan Project. However, during World War II, the federal government did not make ceramic engineers draft exempt, and ceramic engineering departments at universities across the U.S. experienced a significant drop in enrollment as every able-bodied man was called to serve.

=== Postwar era and technological advancements (1946–2010) ===
Following World War II, federal funding for basic research increased dramatically, providing new opportunities for scientists and engineers in the ceramics field. Crucially, the ceramics industry witnessed a shift from the traditional clay-based sectors to applications demanding highly engineered materials, such as electronics, medicine, and space exploration.

These expanded opportunities for ceramic scientists and engineers were reflected in the Society’s growth, which included moving into a custom-built headquarter building in 1954 and surpassing 7,000 members in 1958. By 1965, ACerS had a paid staff of nearly 30 people, and leadership reported an increased student enrollment in ceramic-related university programs across the U.S.

ACerS experienced some financial troubles in the 1970s due to poor budgeting practices, but fiscal housecleaning and increased federal interest in ceramics due to the human spaceflight programs resulted in the 1980s being a boom decade for the Society and ceramics in general. The growing influence of ceramics also caused a reevaluation of the Society’s use of the acronym ACS, which was often confused with the American Chemical Society. In December 1981, the Board approved ACerS (pronounced Ayesirs) as the sanctioned short form.

ACerS launched several new publications and book series in the 1980s and following decades. Notably, the Society partnered with the National Bureau of Standards (now the National Institute of Standards and Technology) on its phase equilibria diagrams product, first launched in 1933, to more effectively stay up-to-date on phase-related information. It also launched two more journals, International Journal of Applied Ceramic Technology in 2004 and International Journal of Applied Glass Science in 2010, to better cater to the diverse interests of its members.

Near the turn of the century, ACerS expanded its ability to better serve the fine arts side of the ceramics community when it acquired the Ceramics Monthly magazine in 1996 and launched the Pottery Making Illustrated magazine in 1997.

=== Modern era (2010–present) ===
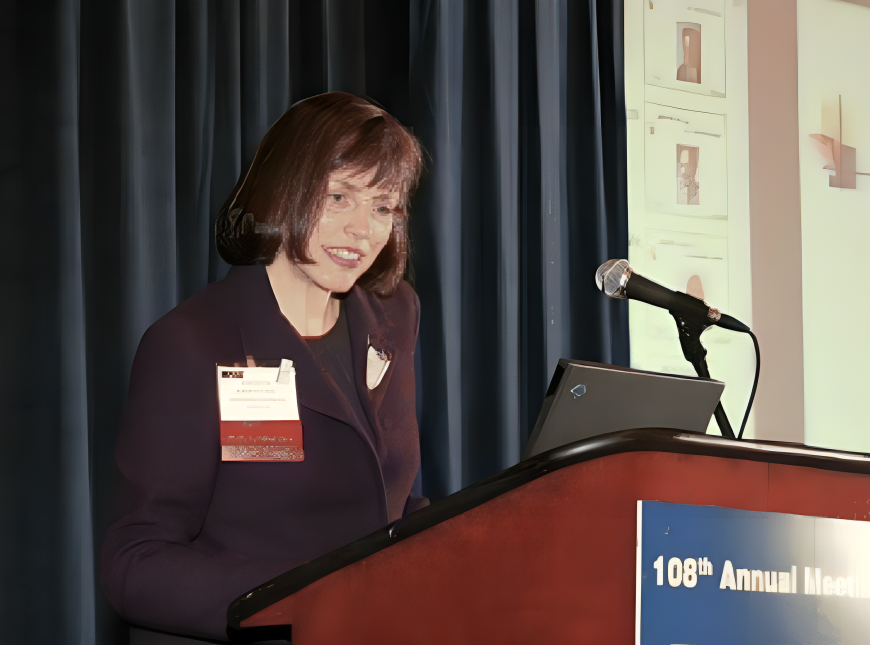
Katherine Faber, 2006 president of the American Ceramic Society, addresses the ACerS Business Meeting

Since 2010, ACerS has worked to expand its influence globally, notably with the launch of ACerS International Chapters in 2017 to serve a similar role as the U.S. Sections for foreign members. It also partners with various foreign organizations on international conferences, including the Unified International Technical Conference on Refractories and the Pacific Rim Conference on Ceramic and Glass Technology. In 2019, ACerS launched the gold open-access International Journal of Ceramic Engineering & Science partly as a response to the growing popularity of open-access publishing paradigms around the world.

In addition to supporting professional ceramic scientists and engineers, ACerS launched the Ceramic and Glass Industry Foundation in 2014 to better support the education and outreach on ceramic and glass materials at the K–12 level. The Society also runs four mentor programs to help members gain the insight, tools, and connections necessary to make a lasting impact in their future career.

In January 2025, ACerS launched a brand-new website for its membership magazine, the ACerS Bulletin, to allow the 100+ years of content to be more readily accessible through libraries around the world.

== Divisions ==
As of 2020, ACerS is organized into the following 11 Divisions:

- Art, Archaeology & Conservation Science advances the scientific understanding of materials found in ceramic art and provides information that aids in the interpretation, reconstruction, and preservation of traditional ceramic art and artifacts, as well as the techniques used in their creation.
- Basic Science focuses on the basic properties of ceramic materials, including their chemistry and physics.
- Bioceramics stimulates research on the science, engineering, and manufacturing of bioceramics, biocomposites, and biomaterials.
- Cements centers on the research, development, and manufacture of cements, limes, and plasters.
- Electronics examines ceramic materials for use in electronic devices.
- Energy Materials and Systems deals with the science and engineering of ceramic and glass materials and technologies for energy harvesting, conversion, storage, transport, and utilization purposes.
- Engineering Ceramics investigates the development and use of highly engineered ceramics and composites in fields as diverse as transportation, biomedicine, and energy.
- Glass & Optical Materials centers on the design, manufacture, and use of glasses in applications ranging from fiber optics to nuclear waste disposal to bioactive tissue scaffolds.
- Manufacturing focuses on meeting the broader needs of today’s manufacturers who produce or use ceramic and glass materials along the entire supply chain. In addition to enhancing networking opportunities, it addresses new manufacturing processes and techniques, sustainability, and business and environmental issues.
- Refractory Ceramics examines the science, production, and application of ceramics for use at elevated temperatures and in other hostile environments.
- Structural Clay Products emphasizes the most efficient and economical ways to manufacture brick, pipe, red-body tile, and other structural clay products.

=== Awards given annually by the Divisions ===
- The Anna O. Shepard Award, named after archeologist Ann O. Shepard, is awarded by the Art, Archaeology & Conservation Science Division Executive Committee for an extraordinary contribution to the field.
- The D.T. Rankin Award by the Energy Materials and Systems Division for an extraordinary contribution to the field.
- The Edward C. Henry Award by the Electronics Division for authorship of an outstanding paper reporting original work in the Journal of the American Ceramic Society or the ACerS Bulletin on a subject related to electronic ceramics.
- The John E. Marquis Award by the Manufacturing Division for authorship of an outstanding paper published in an ACerS publication on research, engineering, or plant practices relating to manufacturing in ceramics and glass.

== Councils and Classes ==
=== President’s Council of Student Advisors ===
ACerS President’s Council of Student Advisors (PCSA) is the student-led committee of ACerS responsible for representing student interests to ACerS and its subsidiary Divisions, U.S. Sections, International Chapters, committees, and classes. The mission of the PCSA is to engage students as active and long-term leaders in the ceramics community and to increase participation in ACerS at the local, national, and international levels. The PCSA consists of five committees: Communications, Conference Programming and Competitions, Education, Professional Development, and Recruitment and Retention.

=== Young Professionals Network ===
ACerS Young Professionals Network (YPN) aims to provide support, community, and leadership opportunities to members as they transition from students to successful professionals that are active members of the broader ceramic society. The YPN is guided by the YPN Steering Committee and its five subcommittees: YPN+1, YPN Connect, YPN Webinars, YPN Programming, and YPN Communications.

=== Material Advantage ===
The Material Advantage™ student program allows students to hold membership in four materials science societies for a single price: The American Ceramic Society, Association for Iron & Steel Technology (AIST), ASM International, and The Minerals, Metals & Materials Society (TMS).

=== Keramos ===
Keramos is a professional fraternity for ceramic engineering students. It formed in 1932 from the merging of two earlier organizations: Beta Pi Kappa at The Ohio State University (1902) and Keramos at the University of Illinois (1914). The fraternity aims to promote interaction between and camaraderie among ceramic engineering professionals and students.

=== Education and Professional Development Council ===
Members of ACerS Education and Professional Development Council (EPDC) work together and with other ACerS communities (including those described above) to support ceramic and glass scientists and engineers throughout different stages of their careers. The Council’s Awards Committee helps celebrate ceramic scientists and engineers by annually selecting recipients for the four EPDC awards. The Council’s Accreditation Committee oversees ACerS efforts related to ABET, the nongovernmental organization that provides quality assurance for post-secondary programs.

== List of past presidents ==
Name	Year(s) of service
H. A. Wheeler	1899
Karl Langenbeck	1900
Charles F. Binns	1901
Ernest Mayer	1902
Edward C. Stover	1903
Francis W. Walker	1904
W. D. Gates	1905
William D. Richardson	1906
Stanley G. Burt	1907
Albert V. Bleininger	1908
Ross C. Purdy	1909
Heinrich Reis	1910
Charles Weelans	1911
Arthur S. Watts	1912
Ellis Lovejoy	1913
C. W. Parmelee	1914
Richard R. Hice	1915
Lawrence E. Barringer	1916
George S. Brown	1917
Homer F. Staley	1918
Ray T. Stull	1919
LeRoy H. Minton	1920
F. K. Pence	1921
Frank H. Riddle	1922
Arthur F. Greaves-Walker	1923
Robert D. Landrum	1924
E. Ward Tillotson	1925
Robert L. Clare	1926
B. Mifflin Hood	1927
Macdonald C. Booze	1928
George A. Bole	1929
Edward Orton Jr.	1930
E. V. Eskesen	1931
Emerson P. Poste	1932
John C. Hostetter	1933
W. Keith McAfee	1934
J. M. McKinley	1935
Francis C. Flint	1936
Robert B. Sosman	1937
Victor V. Kelsey	1938
Andrew I. Andrews	1939
John L. Carruthers	1940
Jesse T. Littleton	1941
Louis Trostel Sr.	1942
Cecil E. Bales	1943
E. H. Fritz	1944
C. Forrest Tefft	1945
J. E. Hansen	1946
John D. Sullivan	1947
John W. Whittemore	1948
Hobart J. Kraner	1949
J. W. Hepplewhite	1950
Howard R. Lillie	1951
William E. Cramer	1952
Ralph R. Danielson	1953
Ray W. Pafford	1954
Robert Twells	1955
Karl Schwartzwalder	1956
John F. McMahon	1957
Richard S. Bradley	1958
Oscar G. Burch	1959
George H. Spencer-Strong	1960
John S. Nordyke	1961
John H. Koenig	1962
Paul V. Johnson	1963
Elburt F. Osborn	1964
Howard P. Bonebrake	1965
George J. Bair	1966
James S. Owens	1967
Loran S. O’Bannon	1968
Arthur J. Blume	1969
J. Earl Frazier	1970
William J. Smothers	1971
Theodore J. Planje	1972
James R. Johnson	1973
Joseph Eldrid Burke	1974
Ralston Russell Jr.	1975
Stephen D. Stoddard	1976
Lyle A. Holmes	1977
John B. Wachtman Jr.	1978
Malcolm G. McLaren	1979
William R. Prindle	1980
James I. Mueller	1981
Robert J. Beals	1982
J. Lambert Bates	1983
Richard M. Spriggs	1984
Edwin Ruh	1985–1986
Joseph L. Pentecost	1986–1987
Dale E. Niesz	1987–1988
William H. Rhodes	1988–1989
William H. Payne	1989–1990
Robert J. Eagan	1990–1991
Dennis W. Readey	1991–1992
George MacZura	1992–1993
Richard E. Tressler	1993–1994
David W. Johnson Jr.	1994–1995
Delbert E. Day	1995–1996
Carol M. Jantzen	1996–1997
James W. McCauley	1997–1998
Stephen W. Freiman	1998–1999
Paul F. Becher	1999–2000
Robert T. Oxnard	2000–2001
James E. Houseman	2001–2002
Gary L. Messing	2002–2003
Kathryn V. Logan	2003–2004
John E. Marra	2004–2005
Warren W. Wolf	2005–2006
Katherine T. Faber	2006–2007
L. David Pye	2007–2008
John A. Kaniuk	2008–2009
Edwin R. Fuller	2009–2010
Marina R. Pascucci	2010–2011
George G. Wicks	2011–2012
Richard K. Brow	2012–2013
David J. Green	2013–2014
Kathleen A. Richardson	2014–2015
Mrityunjay Singh	2015–2016
William E. Lee	2016–2017
Michael Alexander	2017-2018
Sylvia M. Johnson	2018–2019
Tatsuki Ohji	2019–2020
Dana Goski	2020–2021
Elizabeth Dickey	2021–2022
Sanjay Mathur	2022–2023
Rajendra Bordia	2023–2024
Monica Ferraris	2024–2025
Mario Affatigato	2025–2026
Shibin Jiang	2026–2027

== Awards from the Society and the American Ceramic Society Fellow ==
For Fellows of the American Ceramic Society, please see Category: Fellows of the American Ceramic Society.

The W. David Kingery Award is given for "distinguished lifelong achievements involving multidisciplinary and cross-cultural contributions to ceramic technology, science, education, and art".

ACerS Education and Professional Development Council (EPDC) gives the annual Greaves-Walker Lifetime Service Award for "outstanding service to the ceramic engineering profession and exemplifying the aims, ideals and purpose of the newly formed Education and Professional Development Council".

The American Ceramics Society Fellow is awarded by ACerS annually to recognize member who have distinguished themselves through the following:

- Outstanding contributions to the ceramic arts or sciences
- Broad and productive scholarship in ceramic science and technology
- Notable achievement in the ceramic industry
- Outstanding service to the society

== See also ==
- Journal of the American Ceramic Society
