= List of buildings at Ohio State University =

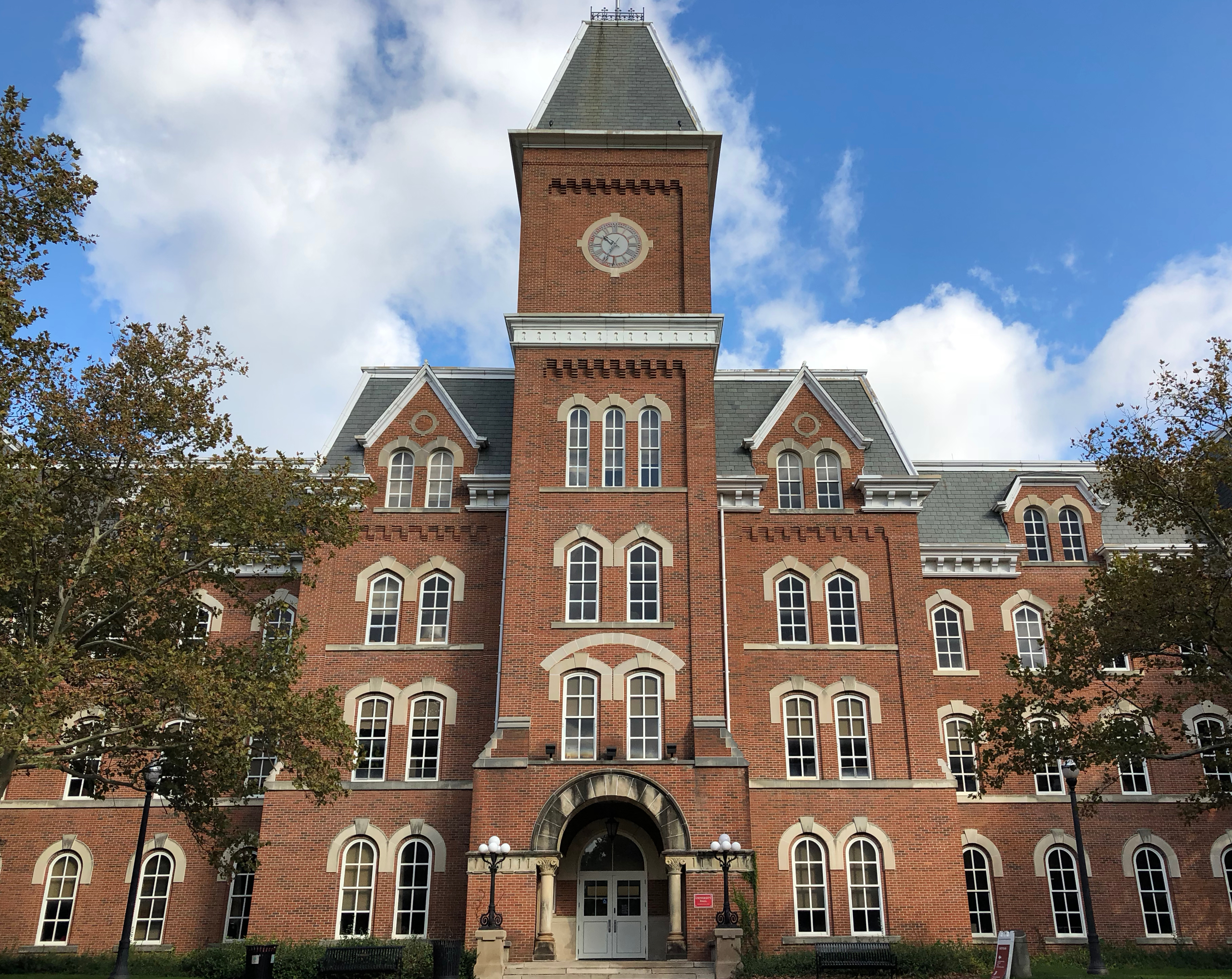
University Hall

This is an alphabetical list of buildings, facilities and other structures at Ohio State University, a public research university in Columbus, Ohio.

== Campus ==
Four buildings are listed on the National Register of Historic Places: Hale Hall (originally Enarson Hall), Hayes Hall, Ohio Stadium and Orton Hall. Unlike earlier public universities such as Ohio University and Miami University, whose campuses have a consistent architectural style, the Ohio State campus is a mix of traditional, modern and postmodern styles. The William Oxley Thompson Memorial Library, anchoring the Oval's western end, is Ohio State library's main branch and largest repository. The Thompson Library was designed in 1913 by the Boston firm of Allen and Collens in the Italianate Renaissance Revival style, and its placement on the Oval was suggested by the Olmsted Brothers. In 2006, the Thompson Library began a $100 million renovation to maintain the building's classical Italian Renaissance architecture.

== Current buildings and facilities ==
| Image | Building | Built | Current usage | Name origin | Notes | Reference |
|---|---|---|---|---|---|---|
| | 11th Avenue Garage | | Parking structure | Garage's location | | |
| | 12th Avenue Garage | | Parking structure | Garage's location | 642 parking spots | |
| | 209 West Eighteenth Avenue | 1991 | Lecture halls | Building's Address | Building designed by Philip Johnson. | |
| | 2740 Airport Drive | | Office of the Chief Information Officer | | | |
| | 33 West Eleventh Avenue | | Student Conduct | Building's Address | | |
| | 45 West Eleventh Avenue | | Planning and Real Estate | Building's Address | | |
| | 53 West Eleventh Avenue | | Undergraduate Fellowship Office; Undergraduate Research Office | Building's Address | | |
| | 9th Avenue Garage East | | | | 991 parking spots | |
| | 9th Avenue Garage West | | | | 1057 parking spots | |
| | Adventure Recreation Center | | | | | |
| | Aerospace Research Center | | | | | |
| | Agricultural Administration Building | 1956 | Department of Agricultural, Environmental, and Development Economics Extension Agriculture and Natural Resources Food, Agricultural and Environmental Sciences Library College of Food, Agriculture and Environmental Sciences | | | |
| | Agricultural Engineering Building | 1986 | Farm Science Review Department of Food, Agricultural and Biological Engineering U.S. Department of Agriculture | | Building not officially named | |
| | Airport Administration | | | | | |
| | Airport Operations | | | | | |
| | Animal House, Kinnear Research Center | 1966 | Environmental Health and Safety | | | |
| | Animal Science Building | 1960 | Department of Animal Sciences | | | |
| | Archer House | 1966 | Residence Hall | John F. Archer, alumnus, died in Korean War | From 1968 until 2005 it was used as an office building | |
| | Aronoff Laboratory | 2004 | Department of Evolution, Ecology and Organismal Biology Ohio State Biochemistry Graduate Program Office | Ohio Senate President Stanley J. Aronoff | | |
| | Arps Garage | | Parking structure | Named for its proximity to Arps Hall | 892 parking spots | |
| | Arps Hall | 1926 | English as a Second Language Program Department of Teaching and Learning Department of Economics | George F. Arps, Dean of the College of Education and Dean of the Graduate School | Original structure built in 1926, renovated and expanded in 1959 | |
| | Athletic Maintenance | | Athletic Maintenance | | | |
| | Atwell Hall | | Health Sciences Administration; School of Health and Rehabilitation Sciences | | | |
| | Baker Hall | 1940 | Residence Hall; Office of Disability Services | Ada Baker, original building owner and women's chaperon | This building houses two separate (but connected) residence halls (Baker Hall East and Baker Hall West). Renovations expanded the building in 1957 and 1958. The building previously contained a dining hall as well. | |
| | Baker Systems Engineering | 1968 | Integrated Systems Engineering; Computer Labs | Chair of the Department of Engineering David F. Baker | Originally named "Systems Engineering Building" | |
| | Barrett House | 1963 | Residence Hall | Thomas W. Barrett, alumnus, first alumnus or student to die in World War I | | |
| | Bevis Hall | 1969 | Biomedical Engineering; Center for Molecular Neurobiology; National Regulatory Research Institute | University President Howard Landis Bevis | | |
| | Bill Davis Baseball Stadium | 1997 | Baseball games | Bill Davis, alumnus and donor | Renovated in 2011 | |
| | Biocontainment Laboratory | | | | | |
| | Biological Science Building | 1970 | Modern biological research | | The building was renovated circa 2008 to upgrade the outdated labs to fulfill research needs | |
| | Biological Sciences Greenhouse | 1993 | Contains an insectary, a mosquito rearing facility, two research labs, a growth chamber area and a preparation room | The greenhouse space contained within | Built on top of the Twelfth Ave. Parking Garage | |
| | Blackburn House | 2016 | Residence Hall | John Thomas Blackburn, alumnus, killed in action at the Attack on Pearl Harbor | Replaced an older building of the same name | |
| | Blackwell Inn | 2002 | Blackwell Inn | Roger D. Blackwell | | |
| | Blankenship Hall | 1997 | Department of Public Safety; University Police | Michael Blankenship, Police Officer killed responding to an incident at the Wexner Center for the Arts | | |
| | Bloch Cancer Survivors Plaza | 1996 | Plaza | Named after Richard Bloch of H&R Block who commissioned the park after surviving lung cancer. | | |
| | Bolz Hall | 1960 | Aerospace Engineering; Civil and Environmental Engineering | Harold A. Bolz, Dean of the College of Engineering | | |
| | Bowen House | 2015 | Residence Hall | Clotilde Bowen, first African American to earn a medical degree from Ohio State, first African American physician and female colonel in the Army, and the first African American women to direct a hospital clinic | | |
| | Bradley Hall | 1955 | Residence Hall | Carolyn Bradley, Professor of Fine Arts | Operates as a single unit with Paterson Hall | |
| | Brain and Spine Hospital | 1987 | | Named for field of treatment practiced | | |
| | Bricker Hall | 1924 | Administrative Offices; University President Offices | John Bricker, alumnus, former Trustee, US Senator and Ohio Governor | | |
| | Browning Amphitheater | 1926 | Outdoor Performance Center | Browning Dramatic Society | Major renovations in 1985 | |
| | Buckeye Field | 1988 | Softball Fields | School Mascot | Renovated and expanded in 2009 | |
| | Athletics Outdoor Facility Support Building | | | | | |
| | Buckeye Village Community Center | | | Named for a region of the campus | | |
| | Busch House | 2016 | Residence Hall | Jon Busch, alumnus, died in Vietnam | | |
| | Caldwell Laboratory | 1950 | Computer Science and Engineering; Electrical and Computer Engineering | Francis Caldwell, First Chairman of the Department of Electrical Engineering | Expanded in 1960 and 1965 | |
| | Campbell Hall | 1916 | Department of Human Sciences; Historic Costume and Textiles Collection | Elizabeth Owens Campbell, wife of Ohio Governor James E. Campbell | | |
| | Canfield Hall | 1940 | Residence Hall | James Hulme Canfield, fourth president of the University | | |
| | Celeste Laboratory of Chemistry | 1986 | Chemistry & Biochemistry | Ohio Governor Richard F. Celeste | Received its current name in 1995 | |
| | Center for Integrative Medicine | | Integrative Medicine | | | |
| | Central Service Building | | Facilities | | | |
| | Chadwick Arboretum | 1931 | Botanical Garden | Lewis C. Chadwick, Horticulture Professor Emeritus | Home to over 120 trees species | |
| | Cockins Hall | 1930 | Mathematics; Statistics | Edith Cockins, alumnus, First Registrar of Ohio State | Named the Pharmacy and Bacteriology Building until 1967 | |
| | Converse Hall | 1941 | ROTC; Military Science | George L. Converse, Head of Military Department | Originally built to house field artillery and named the ROTC Building. Previous home of Ohio State's archives | |
| | Cunz Hall | 1969 | College of Public Health | Dieter Cunz, Head of the German Department | First LEED-Certified renovation on campus in 2010 | |
| | Community Extension Center | 1985 | African American and African Studies | Building's function | | |
| | Chemical and Bimolecular Engineering and Chemistry (CBEC) Building | 2014 | Department of Chemical and Biomolecular Engineering | Joseph Koffolt (Koffolt Laboratories) | Contains Koffolt Laboratories | |
| | Curl Hall | 2015 | Dining Hall | James Curl, Air Force Pilot and Silver Star recipient | Previously, a road ("Curl Drive") was named after Curl, but was removed in the early 2010s. | |
| | Dairy Loose Housing Barn | 1941 | Dairy Farm operated by the College of Food, Agricultural, and Environmental Science, part of the Waterman Agricultural Laboratory | | Fire in 1946 destroyed the east half of the barn, the remaining portion was remodeled in 1968. | |
| | Dairy Research Barn | 1928 | Farm operated by the College of Food, Agricultural, and Environmental Science, part of the Waterman Agricultural Laboratory | | Remodeled in 1991 to include Swine Surgery facility. | |
| | Davis Heart and Lung Research Institute | | Heart and Lung Research Institute; Internal Medicine | Dorothy M. Davis, university donor | | |
| | Davis Medical Research Center | | | Dorothy M. Davis, university donor | | |
| | Denney Hall | 1960 | Department of English; College of Arts and Sciences administration | Joseph Villiers Denney, first chair of the Department of Rhetoric and Literature | | |
| | Derby Hall | 1906 | Center for Urban and Regional Analysis; Geography; Political Science | Samuel C. Derby, First Dean of the Colleges of the Arts and Sciences | Given its current name in 1929 | |
| | Dodd Rehabilitation Hospital | | | Verne A. Dodd, chairman of the Department of Surgery | | |
| | Drackett Tower | 1965 | Residence Hall | Harry D. Drackett, chairman of the Alumni Advisory Board and chairman of the Development Fund | Renovated during the 2015-2016 academic year | |
| | Dreese Laboratories | 1969 | Computer Science and Engineering; Electrical and Computer Engineering | Erwin E. Dreese, chair of the Department of Electrical Engineering 1930-1965 | | |
| | Drinko Hall | 1956 | Law Library; Moritz College of Law | John Deaver Drinko, 1995 Alumni Medalist Award recipient | Expanded in 1959 and 1992 | |
| | Dulles Hall | 1975 | Department of History; Melton Center for Jewish Studies | Foster Rhea Dulles, chairman of the Department of History | | |
| | Enarson Classroom Building | 1950 | Facilities Operation and Development; Office of International Affairs; Classrooms | Harold L. Enarson, 10th University President | Originally a logistical building, renamed in 2013 | |
| | Edison Joining Technology Center | 1997 | Edison Welding Institute Laboratory operated in conjunction with the Department of Welding Engineering | Edison Welding Institute | | |
| | Eighteenth Avenue Library | 1993 | Science and Engineering Library | Building's Location | Originally the Science and Engineering Library, renamed in 2011 after addition of Music and Dance Collections to the building; designed by Phillip Johnson. | |
| | ElectroScience Laboratory | 1955 | Radio Frequency and Optics research laboratory | Building's function | A second connected building opened in 2011. | |
| | Evans Hall | 1976 | Franklin County Coroner | Robert Evans, Franklin County Coroner 1949-1975 | Houses the Franklin County Morgue | |
| | Evans Laboratory | 1961 | Chemistry and Biochemistry | William Lloyd Evans, alumnus, Chair of the Chemistry Department, President of the American Chemical Society | | |
| | Faculty Club | 1940 | Ohio State Faculty Club; Event Space | Main building tenant | | |
| | Fawcett Center for Tomorrow | 1970 | WOSU; OSU Athletics; Event Spaces | Novice G. Fawcett, 8th OSU President | Originally called the "Center for Tomorrow" | |
| | Fisher Hall | 1998 | Max M. Fisher College of Business; Finance; Accounting and Management Information Systems; Marketing and Logistics; Management and Human Resources | Max M. Fisher, Businessman and University Donor | | |
| | Fechko Alumnae Scholarship House | | | Ruth Fechko, assistant director for alumnae affairs | | |
| | Fontana Laboratories | | | Mars G. Fontana, Chair of the Department of Metallurgical Engineering | Renovated and expanded in 2020 | |
| | Fred Beekman Park | | | Frederick Beekman, Director of Intramural Sports and Recreation 1963-1994 | | |
| | French Field House | | | William E. French, faculty representative for the Big Ten Conference for 32 years | | |
| | Fry Hall | 1951 | College of Optometry | Glenn Ansel Fry, Director of the School of Optometry | Originally called the Optometry Building; given its current name in 1983 | |
| | Flight Laboratory | | Flight training | Building's function | Located at Ohio State University Airport | |
| | Galbreath Equine Center | | | Daniel M. Galbreath, Veterinary Professor | | |
| | Gateway Garage | | Parking structure | Named for its proximity to the South Campus gateway | 1176 parking spots | |
| | Gerlach Hall | 1998 | Max M. Fisher College of Business Graduate Programs | John B. Gerlach, Businessman and OSU Foundation Board member | | |
| | German House | | | Named in response to a donation from the Max Kade Foundation, an organization founded in 1944 to advance German-American relations | | |
| | Goss Laboratory | | | Leonard W. Goss, chairman of the Department of Veterinary Pathology | | |
| | Graves Hall | | | Grant O. Graves, chairman of the Department of Anatomy | | |
| | Hale Hall | 1911 | Frank W. Hale Black Cultural Center; Office of Diversity and Inclusion; Office of Outreach and Engagement | Frank W. Hale Jr., | Original Student Union, renamed Enarson Hall in 1986, changed to current name in 2013 | |
| | Hagerty Hall | 1924 | Center for Languages, Literatures, and Cultures; East Asian Languages and Literatures; Film Studies; French and Italian; Germanic Languages; Near Eastern Languages; Slavic and East European Languages; Spanish and Portuguese | Dr. James Edward Hagerty, first Dean of the College of Commerce Journalism | Originally called the Commerce Building; given its current name in 1943 | |
| | Halloran House | 1963 | Residence Hall | William I. Halloran, alumnus, killed at Pearl Harbor (also the namesake of the USS Halloran) | | |
| | Hanley Alumnae Scholarship House | | | Stanley and Mabel Davisson Hanley, university donor | | |
| | Harding Hospital | 1995 | Psychiatric Services | Took this name when the old Harding Hospital merged with OSU | Opened with the name of Neuropsychiatric Facility | |
| | Haverfield House | 1963 | Residence Hall | James W. Haverfield, alumnus, killed at Pearl Harbor (also the namesake of the USS Haverfield) | | |
| | Hayes Hall | 1893 | Industrial Interior and Visual Communication Design | Rutherford B. Hayes, US President, three-time Ohio governor and OSU Board of Trustees member | Oldest remaining building on campus, on the National Register of Historic Places | |
| | Heffner Wetland Research and Education | 2003 | | | | |
| | Hitchcock Hall | 1967 | Department of Civil, Environmental and Geodetic Engineering; Engineering Administration | Embury A. Hitchcock, Dean of the College of Engineering 1920-1936 | | |
| | Hopkins Hall | 1959 | Art; Industrial Interior and Visual Communication Design | James R. Hopkins, Painter and Chair of the Department of Fine Arts from 1924-1947 | | |
| | Houck House | 1966 | Residence Hall | Edwin R. & Ernest C. Houck, brothers and alumni, died in WWII | | |
| | Houston House | | Residence Hall | John Hideo Houston, alumnus, died in Korean War | | |
| | Howlett Greenhouses | | | Freeman S. Howlett, Professor of Horticulture | | |
| | Howlett Hall | 1969 | Agricultural Administration; Food Science and Technology; Horticultural and Crop Science | Freeman S. Howlett, chairman of the Department of Horticulture 1947-1969 | | |
| | Hughes Hall | 1948 | School of Music | Royal D. Hughes, chairman of the Department of Music, 1925-1938 | | |
| | Ice Rink | | Athletics | | | |
| | Independence Hall | 1975 | Office of Academic Affairs; Lecture Halls | Bicentennial of the United States | | |
| | Institute for Behavioral Medical Research | | | Named for field of treatment practiced | | |
| | The James Cancer Hospital | | | Arthur G. James, alumnus, faculty member, pioneer in cancer research and treatment | | |
| | Jennings Hall | 1914 | Center for Life Sciences Education; Mathematical Biosciences Institute | Edward H. Jennings, University President 1981-1990 | | |
| | Jesse Owens Memorial Stadium | | | Jesse Owens, alumnus and US Olympian | | |
| | Jesse Owens Recreation Center North | | | Jesse Owens, alumnus and US Olympian | | |
| | Jesse Owens Recreation Center South | | | Jesse Owens, alumnus and US Olympian | | |
| | Jesse Owens West Park | | | Jesse Owens, alumnus and US Olympian | | |
| | Jones Tower | 1969 | Residence Hall | Lawrence D. Jones, professor of engineering and secretary of the Faculty Council | Originally named "Jones Graduate Tower" as it only housed graduate students. The name was changed to its current name in 2011. | |
| | Journalism Building | 1924 | Arts and Sciences Business Services Center; Criminal Justice Research Center; Post Office; The Lantern | Never officially named | | |
| | Kennedy Commons | | | June Kennedy, first Director of Food Services | | |
| | Knowlton Hall | | | Austin E. Knowlton, university donor | | |
| | Kottman Hall | | | Roy M. Kottmam, Vice President of Agriculture and Home Economics | | |
| | Kuhn Honors and Scholars House | | | Albert Kuhn, Director of the University Honors Program | | |
| | Kepler Club House | | | Robert H. Kepler, alumnus | | |
| | Knight House | | | George Wells Knight, Professor of History | | |
| | Lane Avenue Garage | | Parking structure | Named for its location | 1296 parking spots | |
| | Lawrence Tower | | Residence Hall | Robert Henry Lawrence Jr., first Ohio State graduate named an astronaut, America's first African-American astronaut | A former Holiday Inn that was converted into a residence hall. This building was named "Lane Avenue Residence Hall" when it first opened as a residence hall. | |
| | Lazenby Hall | | | William Rane Lazenby, Professor of Horticulture and Superintendent of Grounds | | |
| | Library Book Depository | | | | | |
| | Lincoln Tower | 1967 | Residence Hall; Offices | U.S. President Abraham Lincoln, who signed the Land-Grant College Act of 1862 | | |
| | Lincoln Tower Park | | | | | |
| | Longaberger Alumni House | | OSU Alumni Association | | | |
| | Mack Hall | 1923 | Residence Hall | John T. Mack, University Trustee | Since being constructed, the building has been expanded twice (in 1935 and 1940). | |
| | MacQuigg Laboratory | | | Charles E. MacQuigg, Dean of the College of Engineering | | |
| | Maintenance Building | | | | | |
| | Mason Hall | | | Maj. Gen. Raymond E. Mason Jr., OSU graduate | | |
| | Mathematics Building | | | | | |
| | Mathematics Tower | | | | | |
| | McCorkle Aquatic Pavilion | | Swimming and Diving Facility | Bill and Mae McCorkle, alumni and benefactors | | |
| | McCracken Power Plant | | | William C. McCracken, chief engineer and superintendent of buildings and grounds | | |
| | McPherson Chemical Laboratory | | | | | |
| | Meiling Hall | | Administrative Offices | Richard L. Meiling, Former Dean of the OSU College of Medicine | | |
| | Mendenhall Laboratory | | | | | |
| | Mendoza House | | Residence Hall | Ray Mendoza, alumnus, killed in Iraq | | |
| | McCampbell Hall | | | Eugene F. McCampbell, Dean of the College of Medicine | | |
| | Mershon Auditorium | | Auditorium used for dance, theater, and music performances | Ralph D. Mershon, alumnus | | |
| | Mershon Center | | | Ralph D. Mershon, alumnus | | |
| | The Metro School | | | | | |
| | Mirror Lake | | Lake | | | |
| | Morrill Tower | 1966 | Residence Hall; Dining Hall | Justin Smith Morrill, U.S. Congressman and author of the Morrill Land-Grant Acts | | |
| | Morrison Tower | 1962 | Residence Hall | Mary Franc Morrison, the first University's first female graduate | | |
| | Mount Hall | | University offices | John T. Mount, Professor of Agriculture and university administrator | | |
| | Neil Avenue Garage | | Parking structure | Named for its address | 978 parking spots | |
| | Neil Building | | Residence Hall; Dining Hall | Named for its location: at 1578 Neil Ave, Columbus, Ohio | | |
| | Newman and Wolfrom Laboratory of Chemistry | | | | | |
| | Newton Hall | | | Mildred E. Newton, Director of the School of Nursing | | |
| | Jack Nicklaus Museum | | | Jack Nicklaus, alumnus | | |
| | North Recreational Center | | | William A. North, alumnus | Replaced William A. North Commons | 2 |
| | Northwest Garage | | Parking structure | Named for its relative location on campus | 643 parking spots | |
| | Norton House | 1963 | | Fred W. Norton, alumnus, died in World War I | | |
| | Nosker House | | | William C. Nosker, alumnus, died in World War II | Replaced an older building of the same name. | |
| | OSU Electric Substation | | | | | |
| | Ohio Stadium | 1922 | Home field for The Ohio State football team | | | |
| | Ohio Union | | Student Union | | | |
| | Ohio Union North Garage | | Parking structure | Named for garage's proximity to the Ohio Union | 604 parking spots | |
| | Ohio Union South Garage | | Parking structure | Named for garage's proximity to the Ohio Union | 790 parking spots | |
| | Optometry Clinic | 2020 | Optometry clinic and Health Sciences faculty offices | Building's purpose | | |
| | Ornamental Plant Germplasm Center | | | | | |
| | Orton Hall | | Contains the Orton Geological Museum, the Orton Memorial Library, and office and lab spaces | Edward Orton Sr., professor of geology and first president of the university | National Register of Historic Places | |
| OSU Oval | The Oval | | Campus Quad | | | |
| | Oxley Hall | | | Agnes Miranda Oxley (Thompson), the mother of University President William Oxley Thompson | | |
| | OSU Center for Human Resource Research | | | | | |
| | Page Hall | | John Glenn College of Public Affairs | | | |
| | Parker Food Science and Technology | | | | | |
| | Park-Stradley Hall | 2012 | Residence Hall | Joseph A. Park, the university's first dean of men, and Bland L. Stradley, vice president of student relations | Originally two separate buildings (Park Hall and Stradley Hall) that were combined in the early 2010s. | |
| | Parks Hall | | | | | |
| | Paterson Hall | | | Alma Wacker Paterson, first female member of the University Board of Trustees | Operates as a single unit with Bradley Hall | |
| | Pennsylvania Place | | | Named for address: 1478 Pennsylvania Avenue | | |
| | Pesticide Handling Facility | | | | | |
| | Pfahl Hall | | Conference Center | John K. Pfahl, Chair of the Finance Department at the Fisher College of Business. | | |
| | Physics Research Building | | | | | |
| | Plant Materials Greenhouse | | | | | |
| | Plumb Hall | | | Charles Sumner Plumb, professor of animal husbandry | | |
| | Pomerene Alumnae Scholarship House | | | Frank E. Pomerene, University Trustee | | |
| | Pomerene Hall | | | Frank E. Pomerene, University trustee | | |
| | Postle Hall | | | Wendell D. Postle, Dean, College of Dentistry | | |
| | Power House | | | | | |
| | Pressey Hall | | | Sidney L. Pressey, Professor of Psychology | | |
| | Printing Facility | | | | | |
| | Prior Hall | 1971 | Health Sciences Library; Medical Center IT; Simulation Lab; Various Departments | John A. Prior | | |
| | Psychology Building | | | | | |
| | Physical Activity and Education Services | | | | | |
| | Radiation Dosimetry Calibration Facility | | | | | |
| | Ramseyer Hall | | College of Education classrooms and offices | John A. Ramseyer, Director of the School of Education | | |
| | Raney House | 2015 | Residence Hall | Alice Rebecca Raney | | |
| | Reactor | | | | | |
| | Recreation and Physical Activity Center | | | | | |
| | Research Center | | | | | |
| | Research Foundation | | | | | |
| | Residences on Tenth | 2012 | Residence Hall | Named for addresses on Tenth Avenue | | |
| | Riffe Building | | | | | |
| | Rightmire Hall | | Biotech Support Facility | George Washington Rightmire, sixth president of the university | | |
| | Rothenbuhler Honey Bee Research Laboratory | | | | | |
| | SAFEAUTO Garage | | Parking structure | | 826 parking spots | |
| | Sandefur Wetland Pavilion | | | | | |
| | Satellite Communications Facility | | | | | |
| | Schoenbaum Hall | 1999 | | Alex Schoenbaum, alumnus and benefactor | | |
| | Scholars House East | 1999 | Residence Hall | Named for the program it houses | Students in The Stadium Scholarship Program live in these buildings | |
| | Scholars House West | 1999 | Residence Hall | Named for the program it houses | Students in The Stadium Scholarship Program live in these buildings | |
| Schottenstein Center | Schottenstein Center | | Athletic Arena; Basketball and Hockey games | Jerome Schottenstein, Columbus businessman and philanthropist | | |
| | Scott Hall | | Byrd Polar and Climate Research Center | William Henry Scott, third president of the university | | |
| | Scott House | 2015 | Residence Hall | Robert R. Scott, alumnus, killed at Pearl Harbor | | |
| | Sherman Studio Art Center | | | | | |
| | Sisson Hall | | | | | |
| | Smith Electrical Substation | | | | | |
| | Smith Laboratory | | | | | |
| | Smith-Steeb Hall | 2013 | Residence Hall | Howard Dwight Smith, University architect, and Carl E. Steeb, alumnus, long-time business manager of the university, and secretary of the board of trustees | Originally two separate buildings (Smith Hall and Steeb Hall) that were combined in the early 2010s. | |
| | State of Ohio Computer Center | | | | | |
| | Steelwood Athletic Training Facility | | | | | |
| | Stillman Hall | | | Charles C. Stillman, Director, School of Social Administration | | |
| The Ohio State University June 2013 05 (Sullivant Hall) | Sullivant Hall | | Advanced Computing Center for the Arts and Design (ACCAD) Barnett Center for Integrated Arts and Enterprise Department of Arts Administration, Education and Policy Department of Dance Billy Ireland Cartoon Library and Museum | Joseph Sullivant, member of the initial board of trustees | | |
| | Science Village | | | | | |
| | Scott Laboratory | | Department of Mechanical Engineering; Department of Aerospace Engineering | | | |
| | Schoenbaum Family Center | | | | | |
| | Siebert Hall | | Residence Hall | Annie Ware Sabine Siebert, first woman to receive a master of arts degree (1886) from the University | | |
| | St John Arena | 1956 | | Lynn St. John, alumnus, basketball coach, and athletic director | | |
| | Starling Loving Hall | 1917 | University Hospital Offices | In honor of Lyne Starling and Dr. Starling Loving. | | |
| | Student Academic Services | | | | | |
| | Taylor Tower | | Residence Hall | Jacob B. Taylor, vice president and treasurer of the University | | |
| | Transplant Services at Kinnear Rd, 770 | | | | | |
| | Telecommunications Network Center | | | | | |
| | Thompson Library | | Library | William Oxley Thompson, fifth president of the university | | |
| | Timashev Family Music Building | 2022 | Ratmir Timashev and the Timashev family | | | |
| | Torres House | 2015 | Residence Hall | Omar E. Torres | | |
| | Townshend Hall | | | | | |
| | Turfgrass Foundation Research and Education Facility | | | | | |
| | Tuttle Garage | | Parking structure | Named for its location | 865 parking spots | |
| | University Hall | 1976 | | | | |
| | Veterinary Medical Center | | | | | |
| | Veterinary Medicine Academic | | | | | |
| | Waterman Farm | | | | | |
| | Watts Hall | | | | | |
| | Weigel Hall | 1979 | School of Music | Eugene J. Weigel, Creator of "Script Ohio" | | |
| | West Lane Avenue Garage | | Parking structure | Garage's location | 280 parking spots | |
| | Wexner Center for the Arts | | | The father of Leslie H. Wexner | | |
| | Wexner Medical Center Garage | | Parking structure | Garage's proximity to the Wexner Medical Center | 1887 parking spots | |
| | Wetland Bike Shelter | | | | | |
| | Wilce Student Health Center | | | John Wilce, football coach, Professor of Preventive Medicine, Director of Student Health Services | | |
| | Worthington Building | | Residence Hall | Named for its location (on the corner of Worthington St. and 10th Ave.) | | |
| | Women's Field House | | | | | |
| | Woody Hayes Athletic Center | | | Woody Hayes, former Ohio State football coach | | |
| | WOSU Transmitter | | Transmission tower for WOSU | | | |
| | Younkin Success Center | 2000 | | | | |
| | Zoology Research Laboratory | | | | | |
| | Zoology Storage | | | | | |
| | 4-H Center | | | | | |

== Former buildings and facilities ==
| Image | Building | Built | Demolished | Former usage | Name origin | Notes | Reference |
|---|---|---|---|---|---|---|---|
| | Armory and Gymnasium | 1897 | 1959 | Gymnasium, Military Department | | Location of the Wexner Center | |
| | Blackburn House | 1962 | 2014 | Residence Hall | John Thomas Blackburn, alumnus, killed in action at the Attack on Pearl Harbor | Replaced by a new building of the same name | |
| | Boyd Laboratory | 1933 | 2011 | Academic Building | James Ellsworth Boyd, a former engineering professor who taught at Ohio State for almost 50 years | Originally built for the State Highway Department. Ohio State took possession of the building in 1961. The site now houses the Chemical and Biochemical Engineering and Chemistry Building. | |
| | Brown Hall | 1903 | 2009 | Academic Building | Christopher N. Brown, Dean of the College of Engineering | | |
| | Cannon Dr South Garage | | 2021 | Parking garage | | | |
| | Hale Hall | 1964 | 2013 | Dining Hall, Cultural Center | Frank W. Hale Jr. | Formerly named Bradford Commons, name changed to Hale Hall in 1989. The dining hall closed in 1973. | |
| | Jesse Owens Tennis Center West | | | Athletic facility | Jesse Owens, alumnus and US Olympian | | |
| | Larkins Hall | 1931 | 2005 | Recreation Building | Richard C. Larkins, a former director of athletics and chair of the Department of Physical Education | The site now houses the Recreational and Physical Activity Center, Physical Activity and Education Service building, and the Bill and Mae McCorkle Aquatics Pavilion. | |
| | Lord Hall | 1906 | 2009 | Academic Building | Nathanial Wright Lord, the first Dean of the College of Engineering | | |
| | McMillin Observatory | 1896 | 1976 | Astronomical Observatory | Emerson McMillin, a donor | | |
| | Nosker House | 1966 | 2015 | Residence Hall | William C. Nosker, alumnus, died in World War II | Replaced by a new building of the same name | |
| A football game being played in Ohio Field | Ohio Field | 1908 | 1923 | Athletic Field | The State of Ohio | | |
| | Ohio Union | 1951 | 2007 | Student Union | The State of Ohio | Replaced by a new building of the same name | |
| | Rickly House | 1856 | 1949 | University President's Residence | The Rickly Family, the former occupants of the house before it was purchased by Ohio State | | |
| | Vivian Hall | 1951 | 2011 | Laboratory Building | Alfred Vivian, former Dean of the College of Agriculture | Named "Agricultural Laboratory" when first opened, but renamed to Vivian Hall in 1958. | |
