= 1961 USA Indoor Track and Field Championships =

National athletics championship event

- Dates: February 25 (men); March 11 (women)
- Host city: New York City, New York, United States (men); Columbus, Ohio, United States (women)
- Venue: Madison Square Garden (men); French Field House (women)
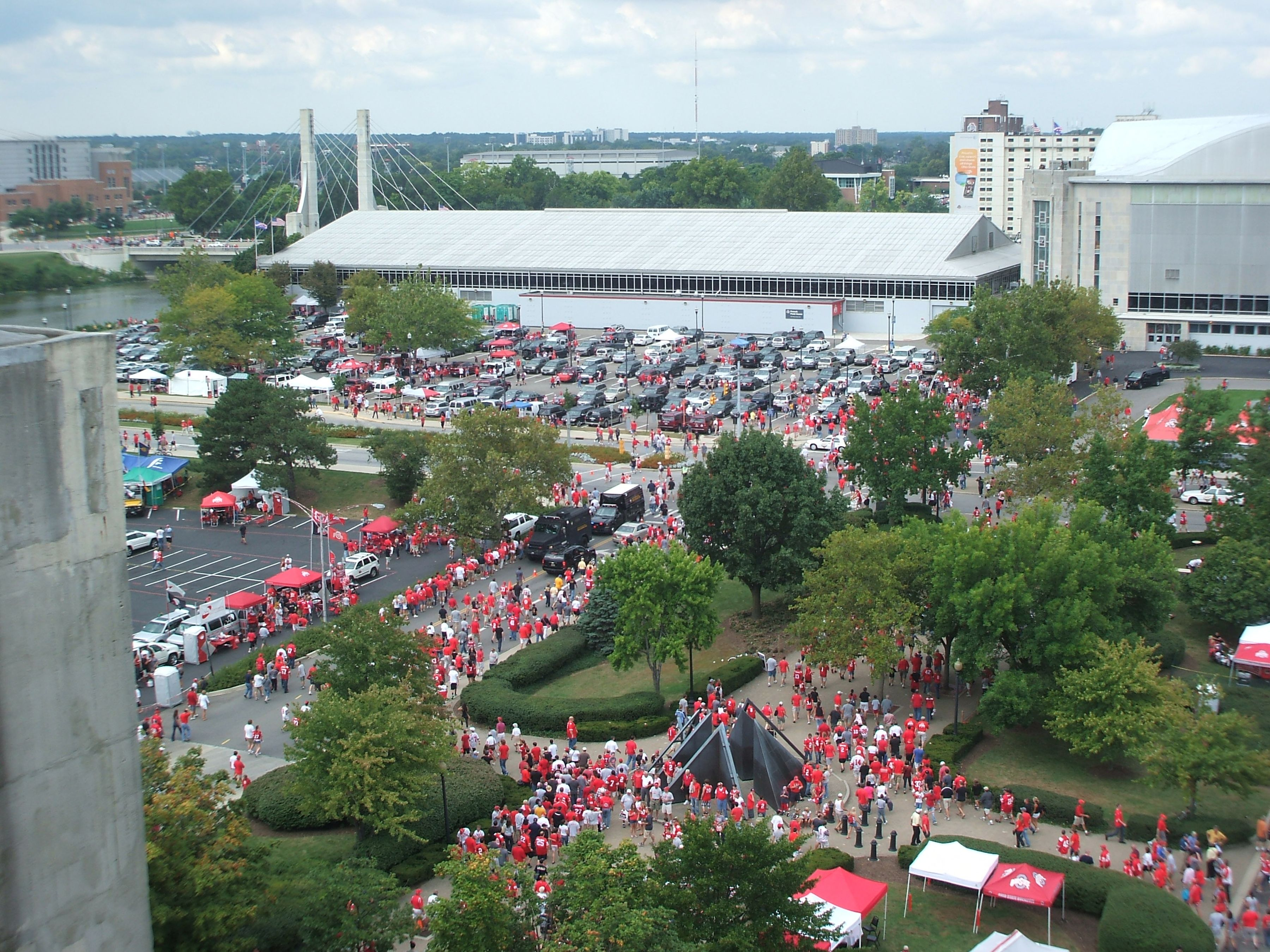
- Level: Senior
- Type: Indoor
- Events: 22 (12 men's + 10 women's)

The 1961 USA Indoor Track and Field Championships were organized by the Amateur Athletic Union (AAU) and served as the national championships in indoor track and field for the United States.

The men's edition was held at Madison Square Garden in New York City, New York, and it took place February 25. The women's meet was held separately at the French Field House in Columbus, Ohio, taking place March 11.

At the championships, Olympic champion Ralph Boston won the long jump ahead of the only other man to jump over 26 feet, Igor Ter-Ovanesyan. 16,243 spectators attended the men's edition.

== Medal summary ==
=== Men ===
Event	Gold		Silver		Bronze
60 yards	Frank Budd	6.1			
600 yards	Eddie Southern	1:11.9			
1000 yards	Ernie Cunliffe	2:08.0			
Mile run	Jim Beatty	4:09.3			
3 miles	Bruce Kidd (CAN)	13:47.0	Laszlo Tabort (HUN)		John Macy
60 yards hurdles	Hayes Jones	7.0			
High jump	Valeriy Brumel (URS)	2.18 m	John Thomas	7 ft 0 in (2.13 m)	
Pole vault	Don Bragg	4.65 m			
Long jump	Ralph Boston	8.08 m			
Shot put	Parry O'Brien	18.67 m			
Weight throw	Bob Backus	20.27 m			
1 mile walk	Ron Zinn	6:38.8			

=== Women ===
Event	Gold		Silver	Bronze
50 yards	Willye White	6.0		
100 yards	Wilma Rudolph	10.8		
220 yards	Vivian Brown	25.2		
440 yards	Lillian Greene	60.4		
880 yards	Helen Shipley	2:21.6		
70 yards hurdles	Jo Ann Terry	9.5		
High jump	Rose Robinson	1.62 m		
Standing long jump	Sandra Smith	2.72 m		
Shot put	Cynthia Wyatt	12.16 m		
Basketball throw	Jean Hofbauer	102 ft 5 1/2 in (31.22 m)		
