= 1963 USA Indoor Track and Field Championships =

National athletics championship event

- Dates: February 23 (men); March 22-23 (women)
- Host city: New York City, New York, United States (men); Columbus, Ohio, United States (women)
- Venue: Madison Square Garden (men); French Field House (women)
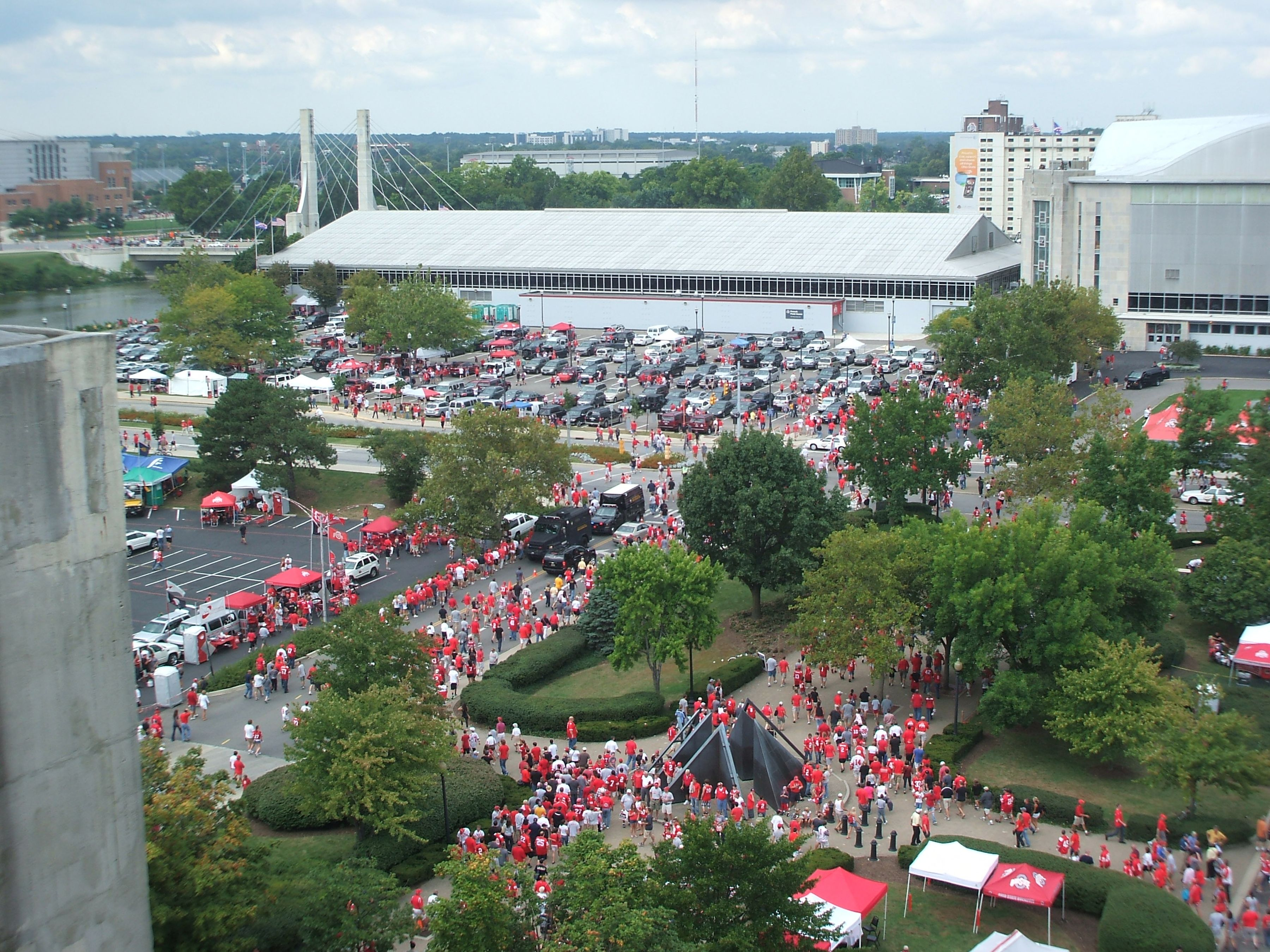
- Level: Senior
- Type: Indoor
- Events: 22 (12 men's + 10 women's)

The 1963 USA Indoor Track and Field Championships were organized by the Amateur Athletic Union (AAU) and served as the national championships in indoor track and field for the United States.

The men's edition was held at Madison Square Garden in New York City, New York, and it took place February 23. The women's meet was held separately at the French Field House in Columbus, Ohio, taking place March 22-23.

At the championships, Jim Beatty ran under 4 minutes in the mile run, his fourth indoor sub-4. 16,213 spectators attended the men's event. As an exhibition, women's 60 yard dash and hurdles events were also held during the men's championships, which were won by Willye White and Tammy Davis in 7.1 and 8.1 seconds respectively.

== Medal summary ==
=== Men ===
Event	Gold		Silver		Bronze
60 yards	Sam Perry	6.3			
600 yards	Jack Yerman	1:09.4			
1000 yards	Bill Crothers (CAN)	2:09.8	Robin Lingle	2:11	
Mile run	Jim Beatty	3:59.0			
3 miles	Michel Bernard (FRA)	13:38.4	Bob Schul	13:38.8	
60 yards hurdles	Hayes Jones	7.3			
High jump	Valeriy Brumel (URS)	2.22 m	John Thomas	7 ft 0 in (2.13 m)	
Pole vault	Dave Tork	4.72 m			
Long jump	Igor Ter-Ovanesyan (URS)	8.09 m	Ralph Boston	25 ft 9 3/4 in (7.86 m)	
Shot put	Gary Gubner	19.10 m			
Weight throw	Al Hall	19.70 m			
1 mile walk	Ron Zinn	6:42.6			

=== Women ===
Event	Gold		Silver	Bronze
50 yards	Willye White	5.9		
100 yards	Edith Maguire	11.1		
220 yards	Marilyn White	24.8		
440 yards	Sue Knott	57.0		
880 yards	Leah Bennett Ferris	2:13.6		
70 yards hurdles	Janell Smith	9.2		
High jump	Eleanor Montgomery	1.66 m		
Long jump	Edith McGuire	5.89 m		
Shot put	Cynthia Wyatt	14.35 m		
Basketball throw	Linda DeLong	103 ft 2 in (31.44 m)		
