= Darren T. Roulstone =

Canadian professor of accounting

- Known for: Capital market research

Academic background
- Education: University of Michigan (PhD)

Academic work
- Discipline: Accounting
- Institutions: University of Chicago Booth School of Business (2000-2008); Fisher College of Business, Ohio State University (2008-present)

Darren T. Roulstone is John W. Berry, Sr. Fund for Faculty Excellence Professor of Accounting at Fisher College of Business at the Ohio State University in Columbus, Ohio, and has been director of its Accounting and Management Information Systems PhD program since 2008. His current research interests are textual analysis of firms’ financial disclosures (specifically, earnings press releases) and how investors acquire accounting information.

== Life and career ==
Roulstone grew up on Vancouver Island in British Columbia, Canada. He received undergraduate and master's degrees in accounting from Brigham Young University in Utah. He received his PhD in accounting from Ross School of Business at the University of Michigan in 2000.

He joined the University of Chicago Booth School of Business as assistant professor in July 2000, and became associate professor in 2004. He joined Fisher College of Business at Ohio State in July 2008 as associate professor of Accounting.

Roulstone currently serves as an Associate Editor of the journal Management Science.

== Research ==
His recent work investigates how firms talk about the future and how firms order the information in their press releases. Regulators encourage firms to provide future-oriented information, and Roulstone and his colleagues examined how firms do this and how this information affects market participants.

== Selected publications ==
According to Google Scholar, the following articles have been cited over 100 times, with one article cited for over 1000 times, and three articles cited for over 300 times:

- J Piotroski, D Roulstone (2004). The Influence of Analysts, Institutional Investors, and Insiders on the Incorporation of Market, Industry, and Firm-Specific Information into Stock Prices. The Accounting Review”, 79(4).
- JD Piotroski, DT Roulstone (2005). Do insider trades reflect both contrarian beliefs and superior knowledge about future cash flow realizations?. Journal of Accounting and Economics”, 39 (1), 55-81
- DT Roulstone (2003). Analyst following and market liquidity. “Contemporary Accounting Research”, 20 (3), 552-578.
- D Roulstone, M Drake, J Thornock (2012). Investor Information Demand: Evidence from Google Searches Around Earnings Announcements. Journal of Accounting Research.
- D Roulstone (2011). Discussion of "Large-Sample Evidence of Firms' Year-over-year MD&A Modifications. Journal of Accounting Research”, 49 (2), 347-357.
- DT Roulstone (2003). The Relation Between Insider‐Trading Restrictions and Executive Compensation. “Journal of Accounting Research”, 41 (3), 525-551.
- DT Roulstone (1999). [Effect of SEC Financial Reporting Release No. 48 on derivative and market risk disclosures]. “Accounting Horizons”, 13 (4), 343-363.
- MS Drake, DT Roulstone, JR Thornock (2015). The Determinants and Consequences of Information Acquisition via EDGAR. “Contemporary Accounting Research”, 32 (3), 1128-1161.
- S Crawford, D Roulstone, E So (2012). Analyst initiations of coverage and stock-return synchronicity. “The Accounting Review”, 87 (5), 1527-1553.

== Awards ==
- 2019 Financial Accounting and Reporting Section (FARS), American Accounting Association Best Paper Award,
- 2002 Ernest R. Wish Accounting Research Award—Booth
