= Blackwell Inn =

Hotel on the campus of Ohio State University in Columbus, OH, US

The Blackwell Inn
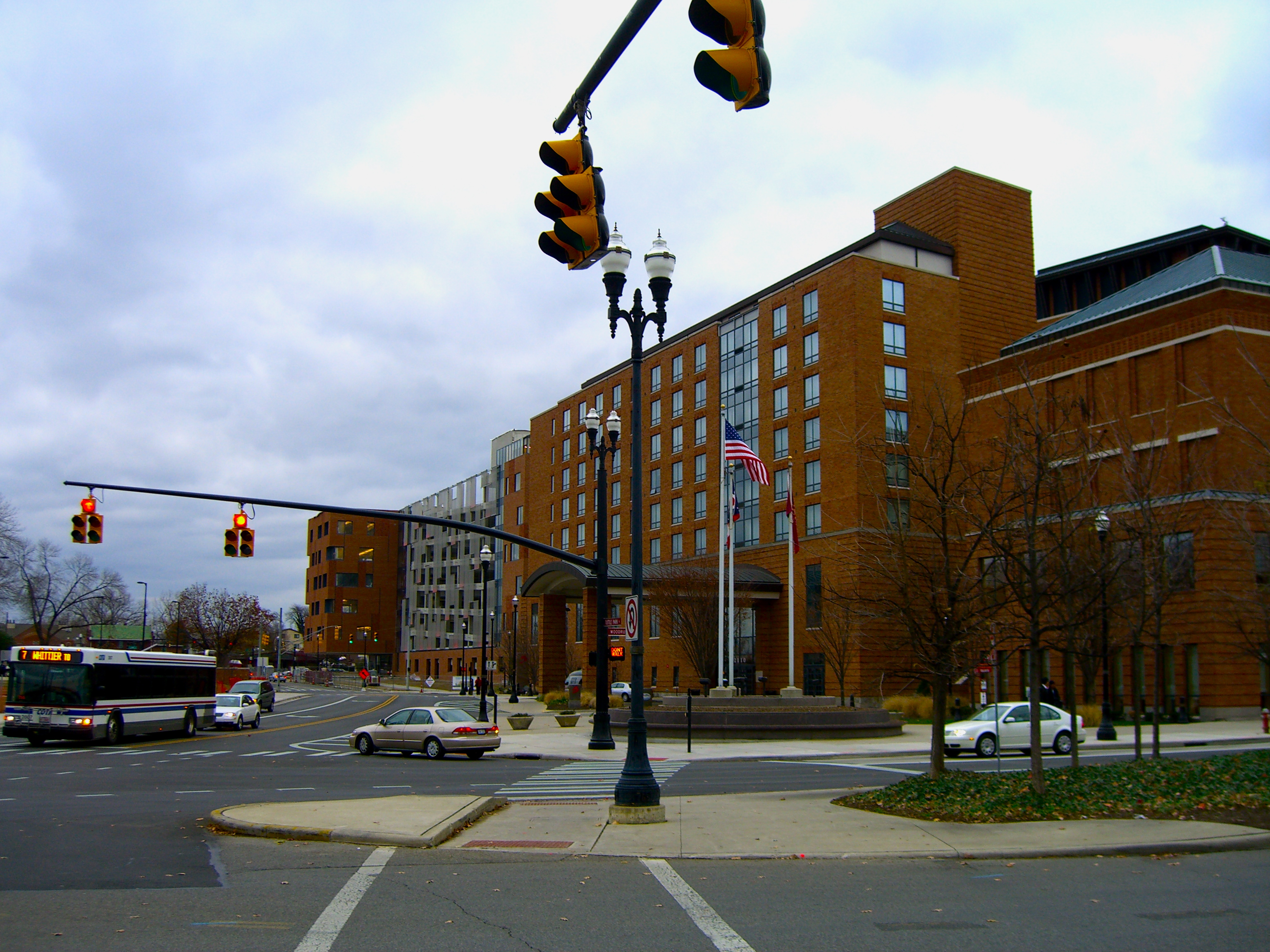
- The exterior of The Blackwell Inn
- Interactive map of the The Blackwell Inn area

General information
- Type: Hotel
- Location: 2110 Tuttle Park Place, Columbus, Ohio, USA
- Coordinates: 40°00′17.25″N 83°1′.1″W
- Named for: Roger Blackwell
- Opened: June 2002
- Owner: Ohio State University

Technical details
- Material: Masonry
- Floor count: 10

Design and construction
- Architecture firm: Karlsberger Corporation

Website
- Official website

The Blackwell Inn is an upscale full-service hotel located on-campus at Ohio State University in Columbus, Ohio. It is located adjacent to The Max M. Fisher College of Business. The Blackwell Inn is named after Roger Blackwell, a marketing professor who pledged $7 million to the university in 2001. Ohio State operates the hotel, and it is the only hotel located on campus. Dining includes Bistro 2110 on the ground floor and The Blackwell Lounge.

== History ==
The Blackwell Inn was built as a part of Phase III of the Fisher College of Business. It first opened to the public in 2002.

== See also ==
- Ohio State University
- Max M. Fisher College of Business
