= 55 metres hurdles =

Track and field hurdling event

55 metres hurdles is a distance in hurdling, usually only run in indoor competitions. This is more commonly run at the high school level. The objective is to approach the first hurdle with seven steps, each hurdle after that needs to have three step intervals. Five stepping, more commonly known as stutter stepping, cuts down a hurdlers momentum and cuts drastic time. Four stepping is less common; however, it is when a hurdler switches their lead leg each hurdle. Unlike outdoor track and field, indoor track usually has no distance hurdles to also run since the typical indoor track is only 160 metres or 200 metres. It is usually an alternative to the 60 metres hurdles.

== 60 yards hurdles ==
Before 1987, the 60 yards hurdles – held over 60 yards (54.864 m) – was contested at the USA Indoor Track and Field Championships and other high-level American competitions. It was replaced by the 55 m hurdles from 1987 to 1990 before finally being replaced with the 60 m hurdles at the 1991 edition. Because the distances are so similar, a conversion of 0.01 seconds is sometimes applied in statistical lists to convert 60 yd hurdle marks to equivalent 55 m hurdles times.

The 70 yards hurdles was also an uncommon distance held indoors beginning at the 1956 USA Indoor Track and Field Championships and ending by the 1963 Championships.

== All-time top 25 ==
Note: Indoor results only. Hand-timed marks excluded

- + = Timed recorded by athlete en route to a longer distance
- * = Converted from time for the slightly shorter distance of 60 yards by adding 0.01

=== Men ===
- Correct as of March 2020.

| Rank | Result | Athlete | Nationality | Date | Place | Ref. |
|---|---|---|---|---|---|---|
| 1 | 6.83 * | Renaldo Nehemiah | United States | 30 January 1982 | Dallas | |
| 2 | 6.86 * | Greg Foster | United States | 21 February 1986 | Los Angeles | |
| 3 | 6.90 * | Mark McKoy | Canada | 21 February 1986 | Los Angeles | |
| 4 | 6.94 | Tonie Campbell | United States | 2 March 1984 | Daly City | |
| 4 | 6.94 | Terrence Trammell | United States | 21 February 1999 | Gainesville | |
| 6 | 6.96 * | Willie Gault | United States | 5 February 1983 | Dallas | |
| 7 | 6.98 | Roger Kingdom | United States | 20 January 1989 | Los Angeles | |
| 7 | 6.98 | Tony Dees | United States | 2 February 1990 | New York City | |
| 9 | 6.99 | Arthur Blake | United States | 2 February 1990 | New York City | |
| 10 | 7.01 | Stéphane Caristan | France | 27 February 1987 | New York City | |
| 10 | 7.01 | Courtney Hawkins | United States | 21 January 1995 | Boston | |
| 10 | 7.01+ | David Oliver | United States | 11 February 2012 | New York City | |
| 13 | 7.02+ | Aries Merritt | United States | 11 February 2012 | New York City | |
| 14 | 7.03 | Allen Johnson | United States | 22 January 1994 | Johnson City | |
| 14 | 7.03 | Ron Bramlett | United States | 10 February 2002 | Gainesville | |
| 16 | 7.04 | Jack Pierce | United States | 10 February 1989 | East Rutherford | |
| 16 | 7.04 | Kurt Powdar | United States | 26 January 2019 | New York | |
| 18 | 7.05 | Shamar Sands | Bahamas | 24 January 2009 | Gainesville | |
| 18 | 7.05 | Omo Osaghae | United States | 14 February 2014 | Lubbock | |
| 20 | 7.07 | Sansiski Daniels | United States | 4 March 1987 | Fayetteville | |
| 20 | 7.07 | Reggie Torian | United States | 23 February 1997 | Iowa City | |
| 22 | 7.08 | Cletus Clark | United States | 28 January 1989 | Houston | |
| 22 | 7.08 | Li Tong | China | 8 March 1991 | Indianapolis | |
| 22 | 7.08 | Tony Reese | United States | 11 February 1995 | Fairfax | |
| 22 | 7.08 | Ladji Doucouré | France | 11 January 2014 | Columbia | |
| 22 | 7.08 A | Larry Wade | United States | 14 February 1998 | Colorado Springs | |

=== Women ===
- Correct as of March 2025.

| Rank | Result | Athlete | Nationality | Date | Place | Ref. |
|---|---|---|---|---|---|---|
| 1 | 7.22+ | Masai Russell | United States | 8 February 2025 | New York City | |
| 2 | 7.26+ | Ackera Nugent | Jamaica | 8 February 2025 | New York City | |
| 3 | 7.28+ | Grace Stark | United States | 8 February 2025 | New York City | |
| 3 | 7.28+ | Devynne Charlton | Bahamas | 8 February 2025 | New York City | |
| 5 | 7.29+ | Denisha Cartwright | Bahamas | 8 February 2025 | New York City | |
| 6 | 7.30 A (Note: mark set during pentathlon competition) | Tiffany Lott-Hogan | United States | 22 February 1997 (Note: by World Athletics source; 20 February 1997 by Track and Field News & BYU Cougars sources) | Colorado Springs | |
| 7 | 7.34 | Michelle Freeman | Jamaica | 22 February 1992 | Gainesville | |
| 7 | 7.34 A | Trecia Roberts | United States | 14 February 1998 | Air Force Academy | |
| 9 | 7.37 | Stephanie Hightower | United States | 25 February 1983 | New York | |
| 9 | 7.37 | Cornelia Oschkenat | East Germany | 27 February 1987 | New York | |
| 9 | 7.37 | Jackie Joyner-Kersee | United States | 3 February 1989 | New York | |
| 9 | 7.37 | Kim Carson | United States | 7 February 1998 | | |
| 9 | 7.37 A | Lacena Golding-Clarke | Jamaica | 14 February 1998 | Air Force Academy | |
| 9 | 7.37 | Kellie Wells | United States | 30 January 2011 | Gainesville | |
| 9 | 7.37+ | Kristi Castlin | United States | 11 February 2012 | New York | |
| 16 | 7.38+ | Tiffany Porter | GBR | 11 February 2012 | New York | |
| 16 | 7.38 | Candy Young | United States | 12 February 1982 | New York | |
| 18 | 7.39 | Kim McKenzie | United States | 24 February 1989 | New York | |
| 19 | 7.40 | Julie Baumann | Canada | 26 February 1988 | New York | |
| 20 | 7.41 | LaVonna Martin-Floreal | United States | 26 February 1988 | New York | |
| 20 | 7.41 | Angie Vaughn | United States | 14 March 1998 | Indianapolis | |
| 22 | 7.44 | Yordanka Donkova | Bulgaria | 27 February 1987 | New York | |
| 22 | 7.44 | Lynda Tolbert-Goode | United States | 9 March 1990 | Indianapolis | |
| 24 | 7.45 | Rhonda Blanford | United States | 23 February 1985 | Lincoln | |
| 25 | 7.46 A | Astia Walker | Jamaica | 6 February 1998 | Colorado Springs | |
| 25 | 7.46+ | Tonea Marshall | United States | 13 March 2016 | New York | |

== World leading times ==
=== Men ===
| Year | Time | Athlete | Place |
|---|---|---|---|
| 2016 | 7.13 A | Jordan Charles (USA) | Laramie |
| 2017 | 7.31 A | Jalen Hunter (USA) | Laramie |

=== Women ===
| Year | Time | Athlete | Place |
|---|---|---|---|
| 2016 | 7.79 | Shadajah Ballard (USA) | Hampton |
| 2017 | | | |
