= WOSU =

WOSU may refer to:

- WOSU (AM), a defunct radio station (820 AM) in Columbus, Ohio, formerly licensed to The Ohio State University until 2011, now WVSG (AM)
- WOSU-FM, a radio station (89.7 FM), belonging to The WOSU Stations, licensed to Columbus, Ohio, United States
- WOSA, a radio station (101.1 FM) belonging to The WOSU Stations and branded as "Classical 101FM", licensed to Grove City, Ohio, United States
- WOSU-TV, a television station (channel 16, virtual 34), belonging to The WOSU Stations, licensed to Columbus, Ohio, United States
