= The Stadium Scholarship Program =

Cooperative living program at Ohio State University

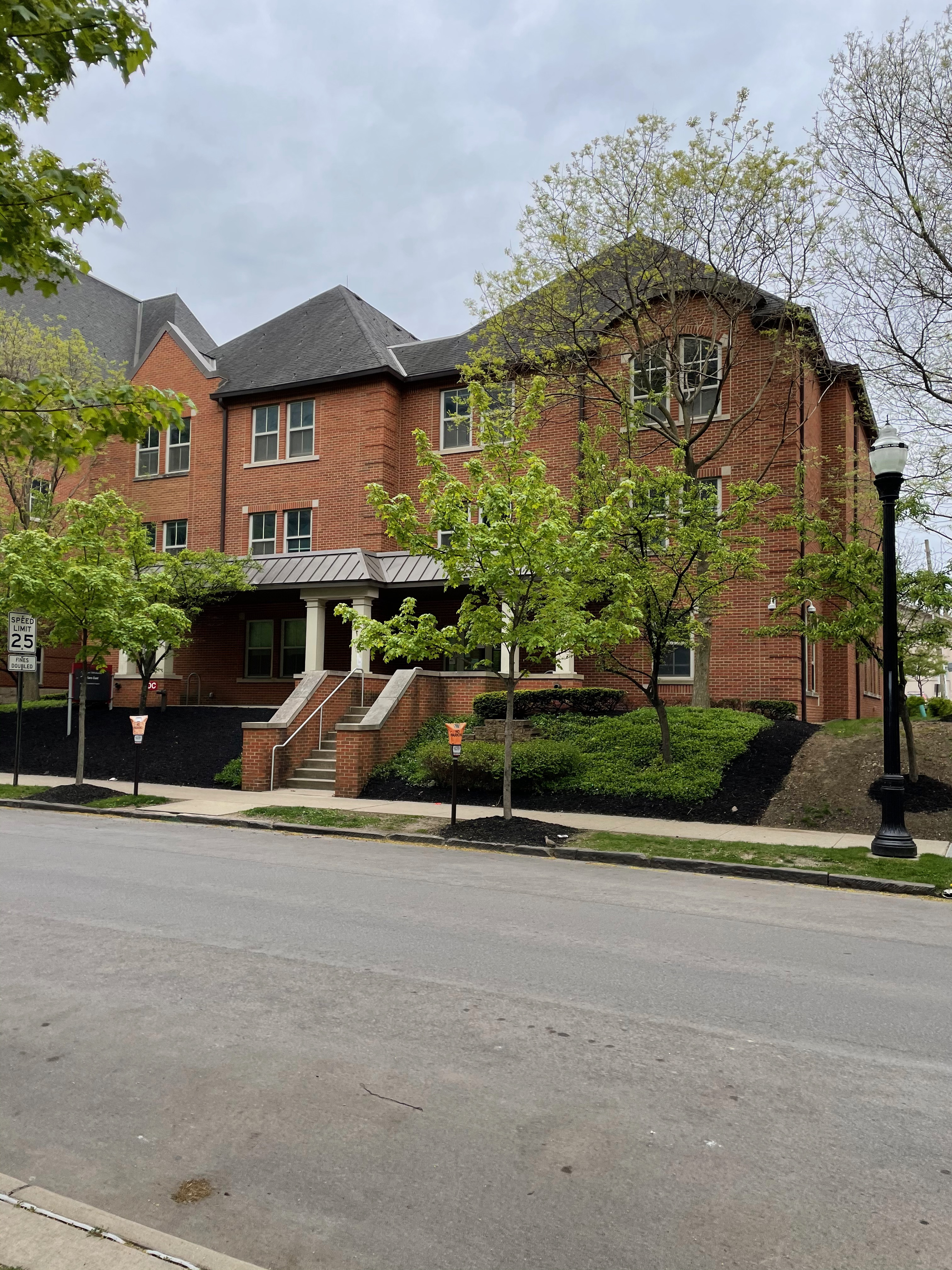
Scholars House East, one of the two buildings that houses The Stadium Scholarship Program

The Stadium Scholarship Program is a cooperative program originally housed in residence quarters in the west side of Ohio Stadium - thus the name. Students participate in residence hall activities, leadership positions, community service projects, relationships with alumni, and the cooperative work program.

== Cooperative Work Program ==
One of the fundamental aspects of the Stadium Scholarship Program was the cooperative work program. Students used to work 5–7 hours a week, or 50–70 hours a quarter in the hall in exchange for the reduced discount housing fees received at the beginning of every quarter. Hours were flexible around class and exam schedules.

As of recently, students now have community, service, and study hours that they need to complete. Each semester students need to complete 30 community hours, 8 service hours, and 15 study hours. If a student does not complete these hours, they will have to pay $23 (as of Autumn 2026) per hour missed. Community hours can be achieved by participating in events held by other members of the program, or events hosted by other community members. Service hours can be earned through volunteering. A popular option among SSP students is the Monda Resource Center. Study hours can be earned by studying during a “study hop”. These study hops are hosted by other members of the program.

== History ==
=== Origins ===
The concept was the brainchild of Joseph A. Park, who was the university's dean of men at the time. Park noticed that many Ohio high school students weren't going to college because they could not afford it. In 1933, a group of 75 young male students with limited financial means moved into the Ohio Stadium. Those young men lived in barrack-like conditions in the stadium's southwest corner, which would become known as the Tower Club. In exchange for a break on rent, the young men did all the chores in the no-frills dorm, except cooking, while they attended classes at Ohio State University. This is incorrect, as the Ohio state legislature officially named the institution "The Ohio State University".

In subsequent years, the dorm expanded along the west side of the stadium and became co-educational in 1975, and additional names, such as Buckeye and Tower clubs, were placed on the living quarters. Through the years, the unique dorm gained national attention. First Lady Eleanor Roosevelt even visited the student living quarters housed in the Horseshoe. And, in more recent history, the dorm was featured several times during nationally televised OSU football games.

=== Departure from Ohio Stadium ===
In 1975, the program and the Stadium dormitory were expanded several times. The university completed a multimillion-dollar renovation in the mid-1980s resulting in a residence hall that housed approximately 360 students. In the late 1990s, the university sought to expand and renovate Ohio Stadium. The decision was made to move the Stadium Scholarship Program to Mack Hall. The program later moved to Scholars House East and Scholars House West on Tenth Avenue.
