= Mirror Lake (Ohio) =

Reservoir in Columbus, Ohio, US

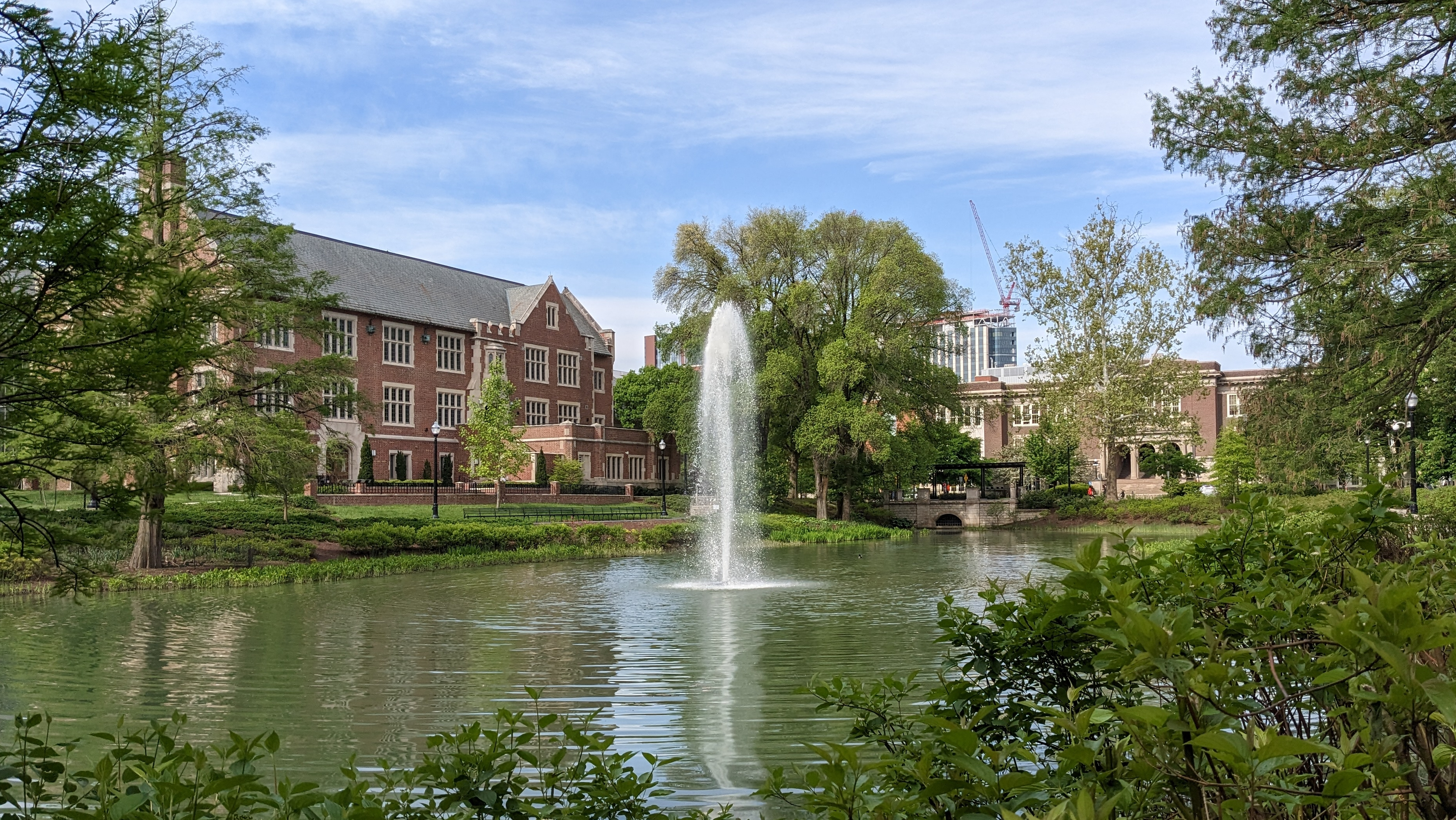

- Location within Ohio Location within the United States Location within North America
- Interactive map of Mirror Lake
- Location: Ohio State University, Columbus, Ohio
- Coordinates: 39°59′53″N 083°00′52″W
- Type: Reservoir
- Primary inflows: Groundwater
- Primary outflows: Sewer to Olentangy River
- Basin countries: United States
- Water volume: 666,500 US gallons (2,523,000 L)
- Surface elevation: 738 ft (225 m)

Mirror Lake is a pond on the campus of the Ohio State University in Columbus, Ohio. Visitors, students, faculty, and staff visit the fountains that run in spring, summer, and autumn.

== History ==
Historically, the lake was spring-fed, and sat on the property of William Neil. The trustees in charge of purchasing land for the new Ohio Agricultural and Mechanical College, which would later become the Ohio State University, chose Neil's land, possibly after drinking from the spring. The spring dried up in 1891 when the city of Columbus struck the source of the spring while installing a sewer line through campus. Between 1891 and 1972, the lake was filled using water from the Olentangy River. The water source was subsequently provided by the city of Columbus municipal water supply, at a new location on campus near the location of the original lake.

In 2014, a well was dug to feed the lake from groundwater, eliminating the need to use municipal water.

== Traditions ==
=== Mirror Lake jumps ===
It was a tradition for students to jump into the lake at night in the week leading up to the annual football game between the Ohio State Buckeyes and the Michigan Wolverines. Although students have jumped into Mirror Lake since 1969, the modern tradition started in 1990 when “Marmaduke” and members of AEPi led the marching band and some students on a traditional march around campus. At the end of the parade — at Mirror Lake — students made the celebratory jump. Approximately 12,000 people either jumped or were near the lake for the 2009 jump. Jumps have occurred several times outside of Michigan Week, including on the night of May 1, 2011 when students jumped into the lake after the death of Osama bin Laden. The Mirror Lake Jump events were not university sponsored, and people were encouraged by university officials to not participate in the events. The tradition ended in 2015 after a student died, and the university began enforcing policies to prevent jumps. Jumping into Mirror Lake is a fourth-degree misdemeanor, however police acknowledged that they ignored this during jump events in order to focus on the safety of those present.

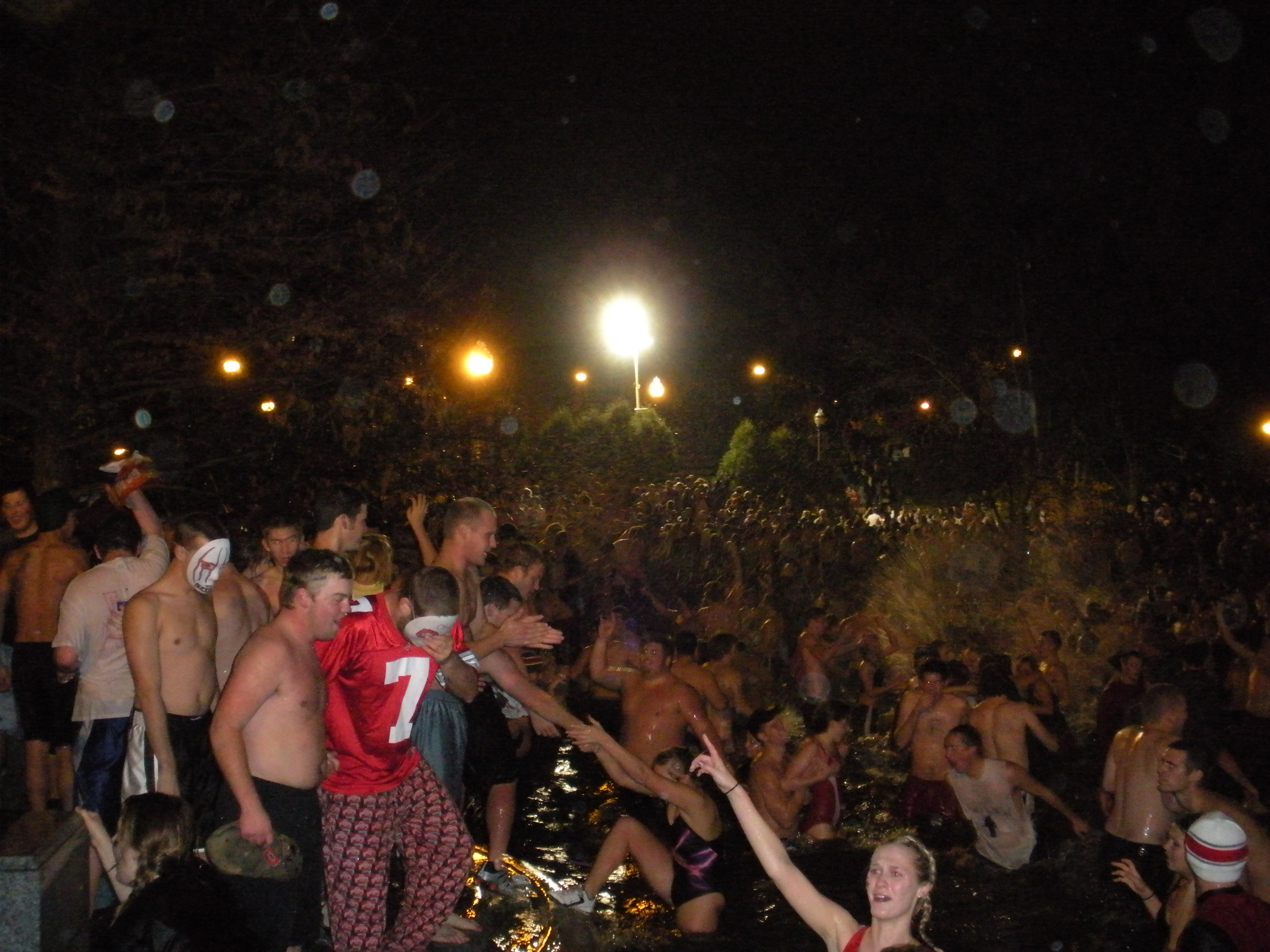
Students jumping in Mirror Lake before the 2009 game

==== Sanitation ====
A study was conducted during one of the Mirror Lake Jumps in which water samples were taken from the lake throughout the night. Ammonia levels greatly increased over time. This has been attributed to people urinating in the lake. There has also been concern that the lake may be a potential source for disease infection, including Salmonellosis.

==== Deaths and injuries ====
The event was associated with a variety of emergency room visits, and loss or destruction of property. The 2009 jump, for example, was associated with approximately 25 trips to the emergency department for cuts, sprains, and other injuries, as well as other injuries exacerbated by the use of alcohol. In 1985, a student was left paralyzed after making a shallow dive into the lake, and hitting her head on an underwater planter. In 2013, a man was found unresponsive in the lake during a lake jump and later died.

On November 25, 2015, shortly after midnight, Austin Singletary's body was found underwater after jumping into Mirror Lake during the annual jump. A preliminary investigation and autopsy concluded that the death was the result of a fracture of the C-5 vertebra, which can lead to paralysis of the arms, legs and diaphragm, causing death. He was pulled from the lake in cardiac arrest around 12:20 a.m. He immediately received treatment by on-site paramedics and was rushed to Wexner Medical Center on Ohio State's campus, but later died. University officials took to social media and news outlets to help identify Singletary. President Michael V. Drake later released a statement, saying, "We are heartbroken over this horrible tragedy. We have tentatively identified the young man as a student and are in the process of reaching out to his family. During this difficult time, counseling services will be made available throughout the holiday weekend for those who seek support."

==== End of the tradition ====
After the death of Austin Singletary, Ohio State Officials quickly announced plans to work with students and the Ohio State community to end the annual jump. Ohio State's Undergraduate Student Government soon after released a statement agreeing to work with the university to end the tradition and "create a new one". After Mirror Lake was reconstructed in 2017, several new features were added to discourage jumps, including a "quick-drain" feature, and dense vegetation between the path and the lake. The lake is generally drained each year around the Ohio State–Michigan game to prevent jumps. Ohio State's Police Department has cited several students for attempting to jump in the lake area for criminal trespassing.

=== Light Up the Lake ===
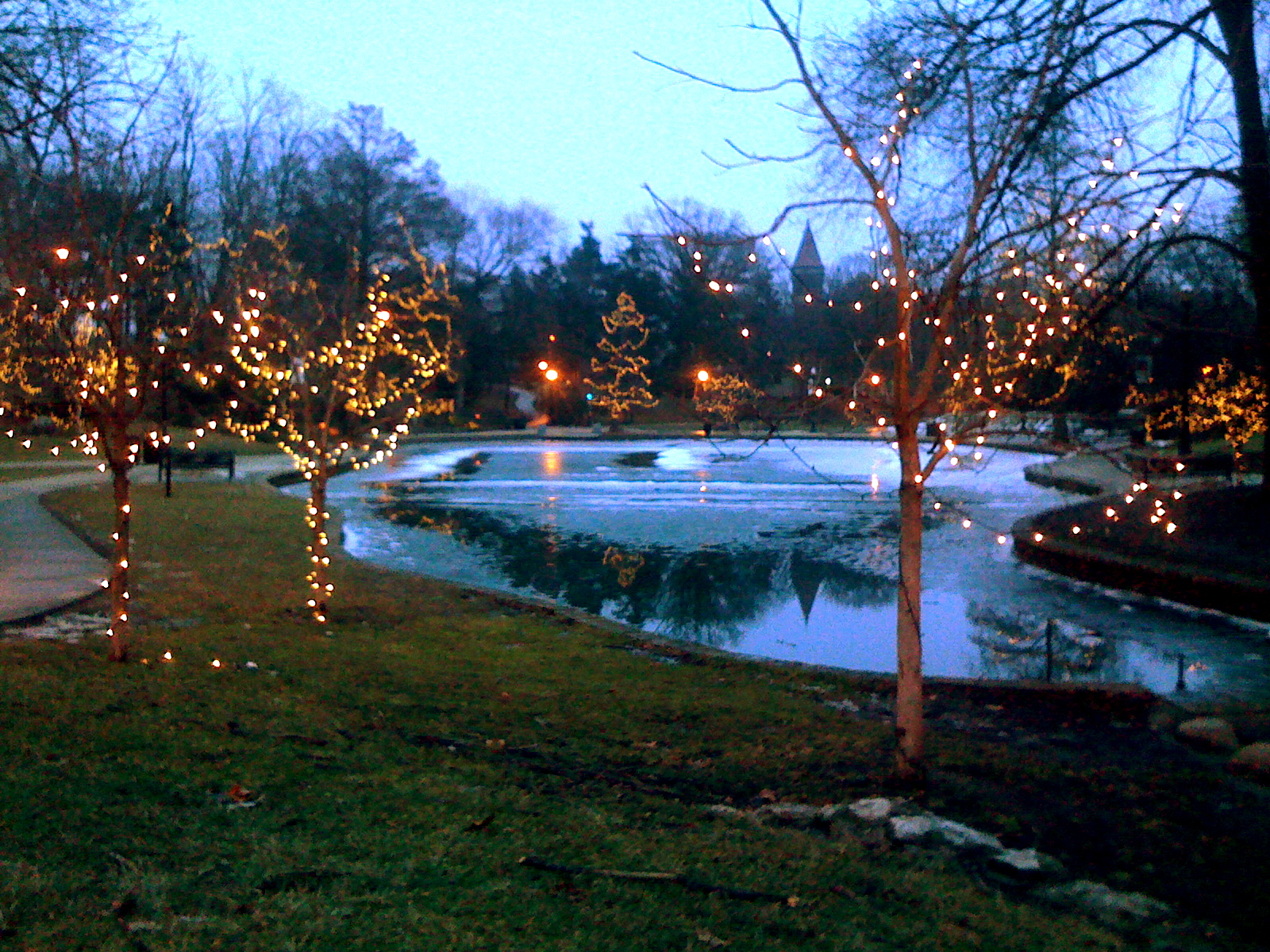
Mirror Lake during a Light Up the Lake event

Light Up the Lake is an event held annually to start the winter holiday season. Christmas lights are hung throughout the Mirror Lake and Browning Amphitheater area. A lighting ceremony takes place when the lights are turned on for the first time of the season, usually the week following Thanksgiving. These lights are left up for several weeks throughout the winter months. The lights and lighting ceremony are organized by the Ohio Staters, a student service organization. Light Up the Lake occurs most years, but not every year, depending on construction and other factors determined by the university.
