= Fisher College of Business =

Part of Ohio State University

- (2002)
- Other name: Max M. Fisher College of Business
- Former names: College of Commerce and Journalism (1916–1993)
- Type: Public business school
- Established: March 7, 1916 (110 years ago)
- Parent institution: Ohio State University
- Accreditation: Association to Advance Collegiate Schools of Business (AACSB)
- Endowment: $120 million
- Dean: Aravind Chandrasekaran
- Location: Columbus, Ohio, U.S. 40°00′16.62″N 83°00′54.17″W
- Campus: Urban
- Nickname: Fisher
- Website: fisher.osu.edu

The Fisher College of Business is the business school of Ohio State University, a public research university in Columbus, Ohio, United States.

Fisher's campus is located on the northern part of the university within a partially enclosed business campus adjacent to St. John Arena. It is composed of brick buildings loosely arranged in a quadrangle. The 370,000-square-foot (34,000 m^{2}) complex is the largest multi-building project ever undertaken by the university.

Fisher is one of the founding members of the Association to Advance Collegiate Schools of Business (AACSB).

Established in 1916 as the College of Commerce and Journalism, the college was renamed in 1993 for Max M. Fisher, a 1930 Ohio State graduate who led efforts to provide a $20 million gift to the college. It has nearly 83,000 living alumni.

== Academics ==
Business school rankings

United States
- Bloomberg MBA: 39
- USNWR MBA: 24

Global
- QS MBA: 92

For undergraduate students at Ohio State University, Fisher offers minors and certificates attached to a larger degree open to all students enrolled at the university. For students enrolled in the college, Fisher offers thirteen specializations through their Bachelor of Science in Business Administration (BSBA) program.

Fisher offers several programs for graduate students housed at the Gerlach Graduate Programs Building. These include a Master of Business Administration program for both full-time and part-time graduate students, as well as several specialized programs at both the master and doctoral level. The college also offers executive education programs, including the Executive MBA, the Master of Business Operational Excellence, and other custom corporate programs.

== Campus ==
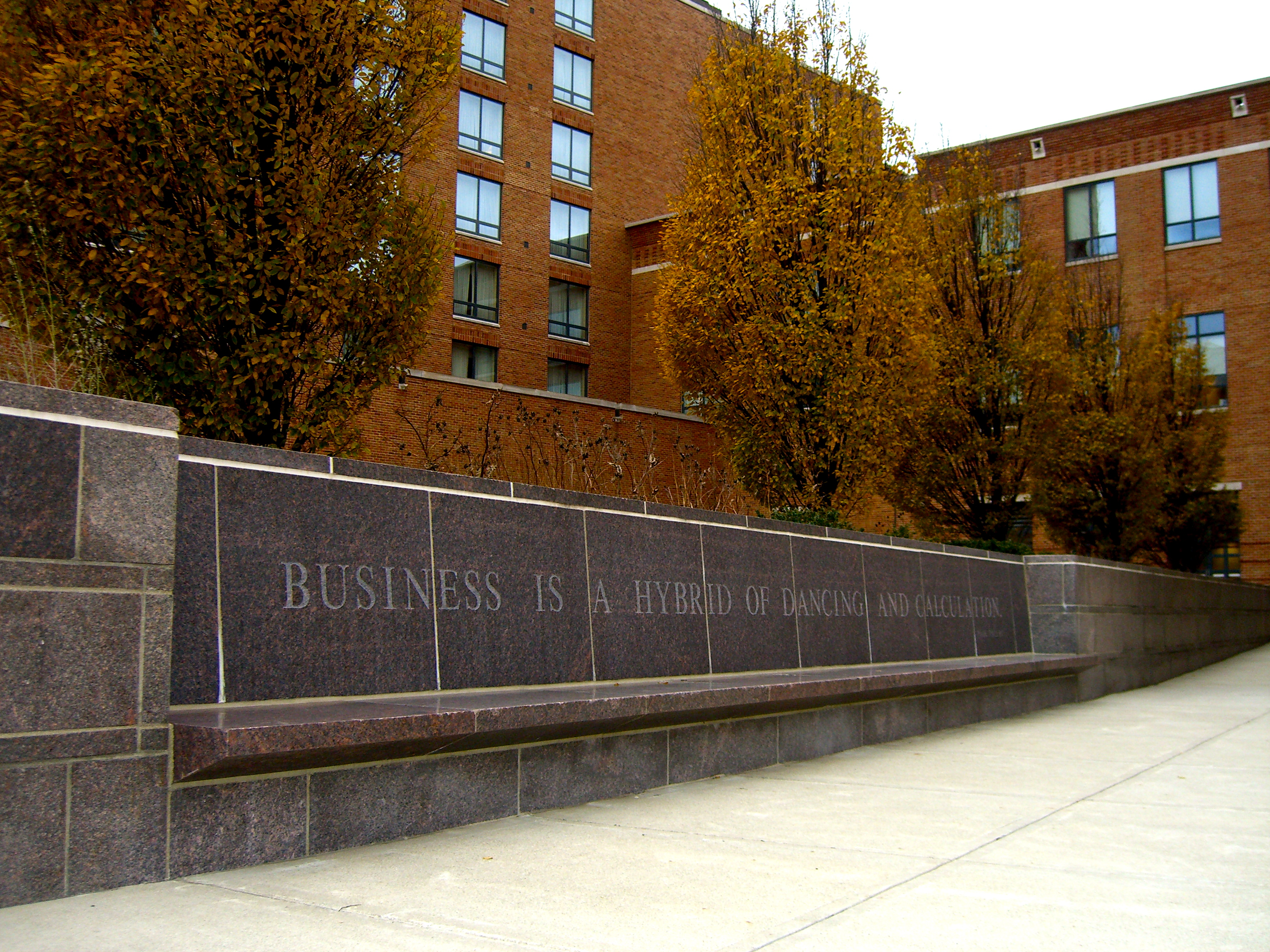
Many quotations can be found etched into Fisher's campus. (2005)

The six-building campus (designed by Kallmann, McKinnell & Wood, Cooper, Robertson & Partners with Karlsberger Architecture as Architect of Record) is oriented around its largest building, the signature Fisher Hall, which is the same height as the William Oxley Thompson Memorial Library, the main university library, and on axis with it. This visually links the college to the larger OSU campus.

The organization of undergraduate buildings, graduate study, and administration cluster around a traditional campus green that encourages social mixing of different student bodies and faculty. The brick architecture reinterprets the neo-classical tradition found throughout OSU.

Cooper, Robertson & Partners designed both Fisher Hall and Pfahl Hall, the executive education building. Kallmann, McKinnell & Wood designed Gerlach Hall, Schoenbaum Hall and Mason Hall. RTKL was hired as the hospitality consultant for the Blackwell Inn. Karlsberger completed all design documents and served as construction administrator for the entire complex.

The campus consists of the following buildings and offices:

- Fisher Hall
  - Faculty offices
  - Administrative offices
  - Research and business partnership centers
- Gerlach Hall
  - Graduate business programs
  - Batten investment laboratory
  - Office of Career Management
- Mason Hall
  - Student computer labs
  - Office of Information Technology Services
  - Rohr Cafe
- Pfahl Hall
  - Executive education programs
  - Conference center
  - 2110 Restaurant
- Schoenbaum Hall
  - Undergraduate business programs
  - Berry auditorium
- The Blackwell Inn and Conference Center
  - 151 Hotel rooms
  - Conference rooms
  - Banquet facilities

The American Accounting Association's Hall of Fame was established at Fisher in 1950 to honor those who in some way distinguished themselves in the field. An international board of accountants nominate and select new members annually to add to the 78 inducted members. Current Ohio State University faculty are prohibited from nomination. In 2017, OSU entered into an agreement with the American Accounting Association to transfer the authority to host the Accounting Hall of Fame to the AAA.

== Affiliations ==
Fisher College of Business has exchange programs and memoranda of understanding (MoUs) with other universities, including Atatürk University in Erzerum, Turkey; and the Indian Institute of Management Ahmedabad, in Ahmedabad, Gujarat, India.

== Gallery ==
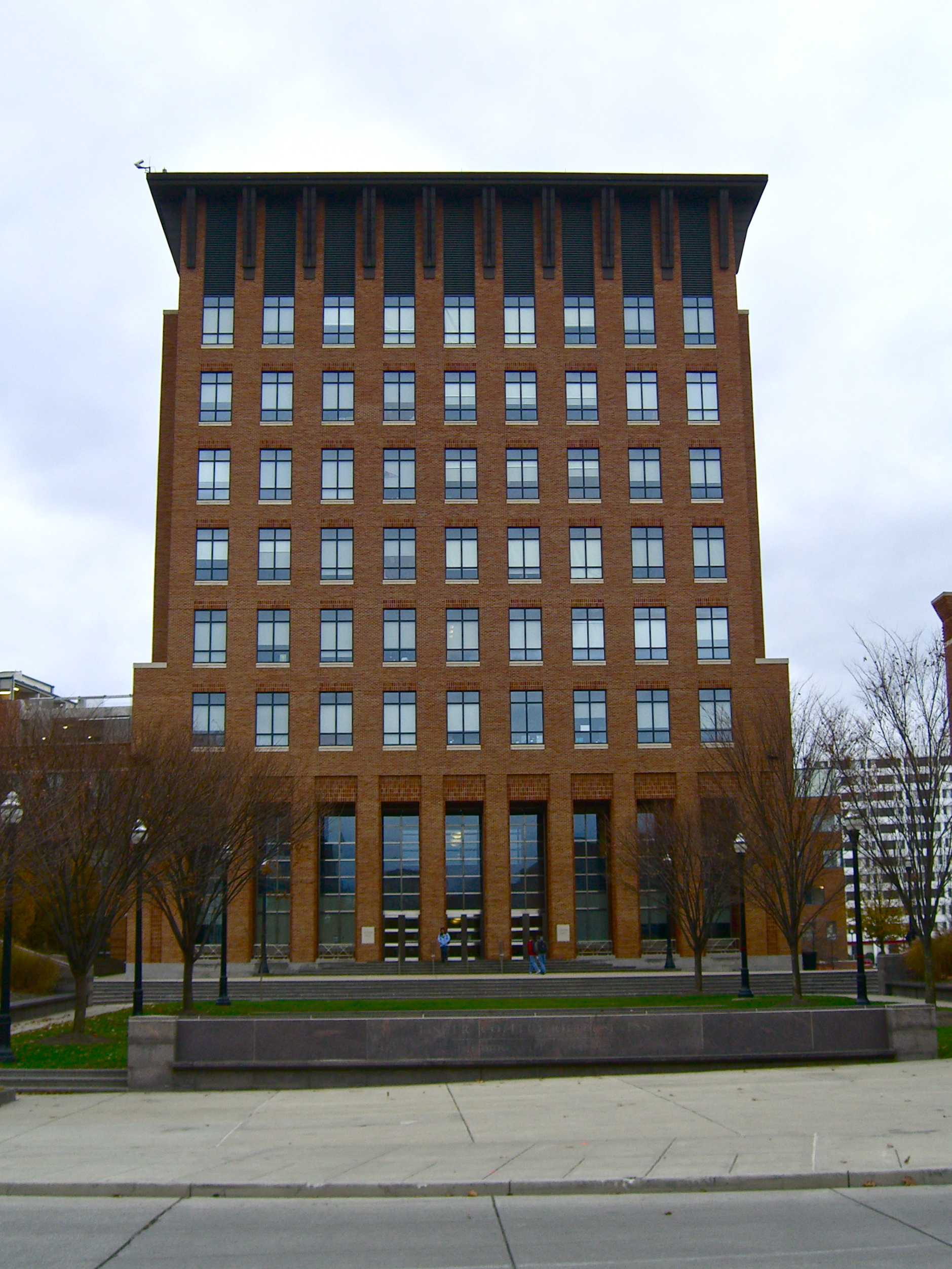
Fisher Hall (2005)

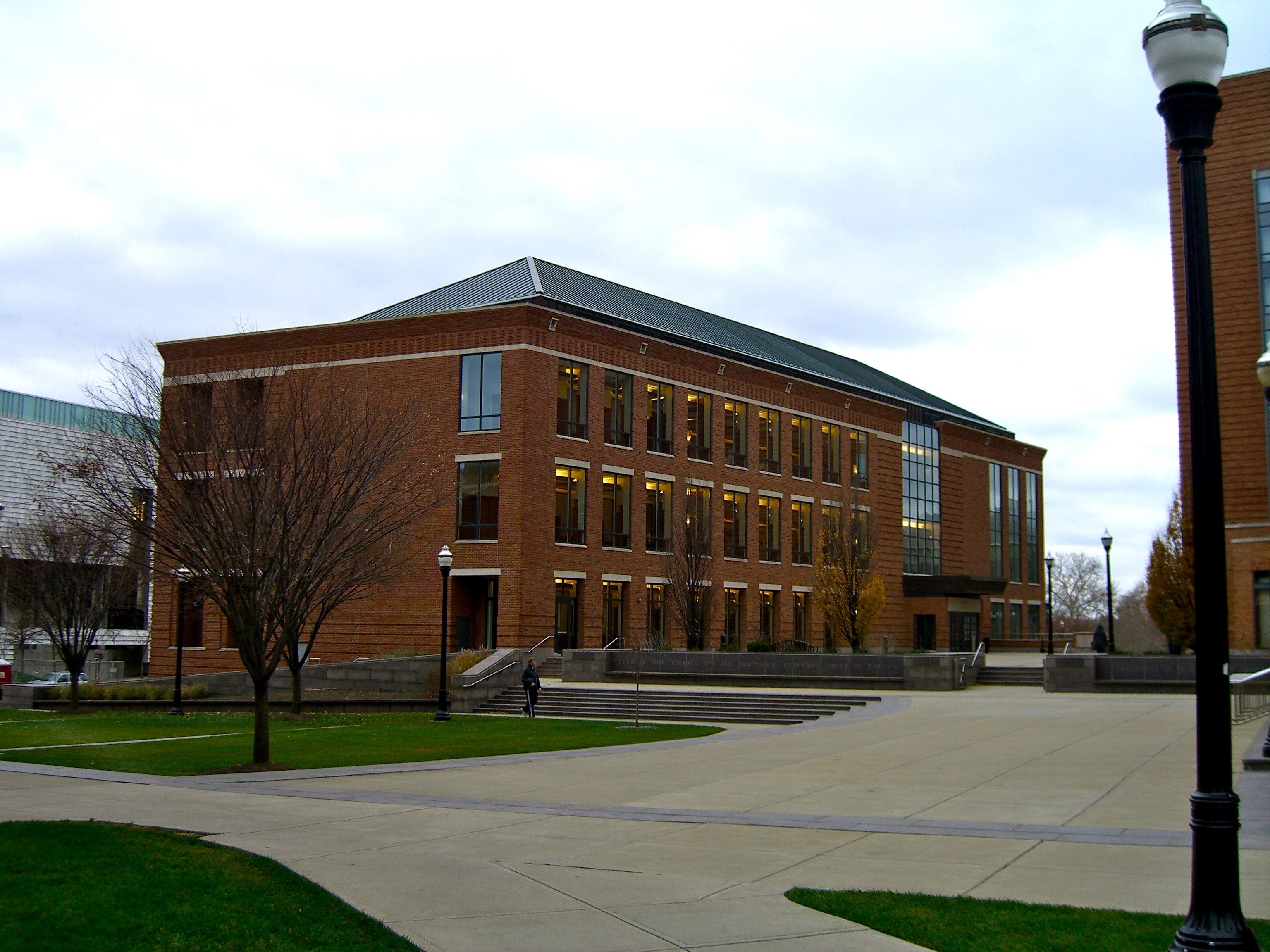
Pfahl Hall (2005)

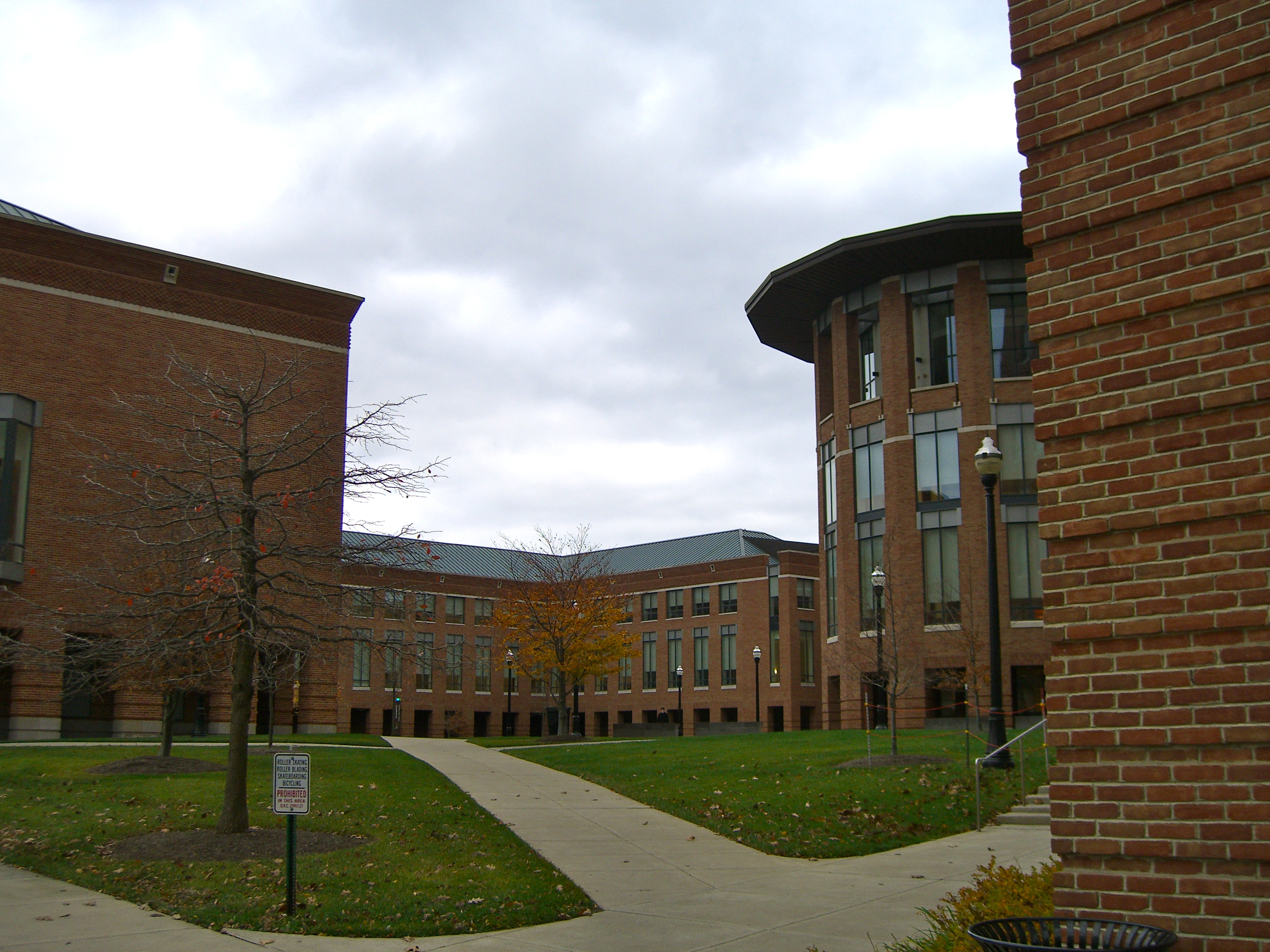
Courtyard (2005)

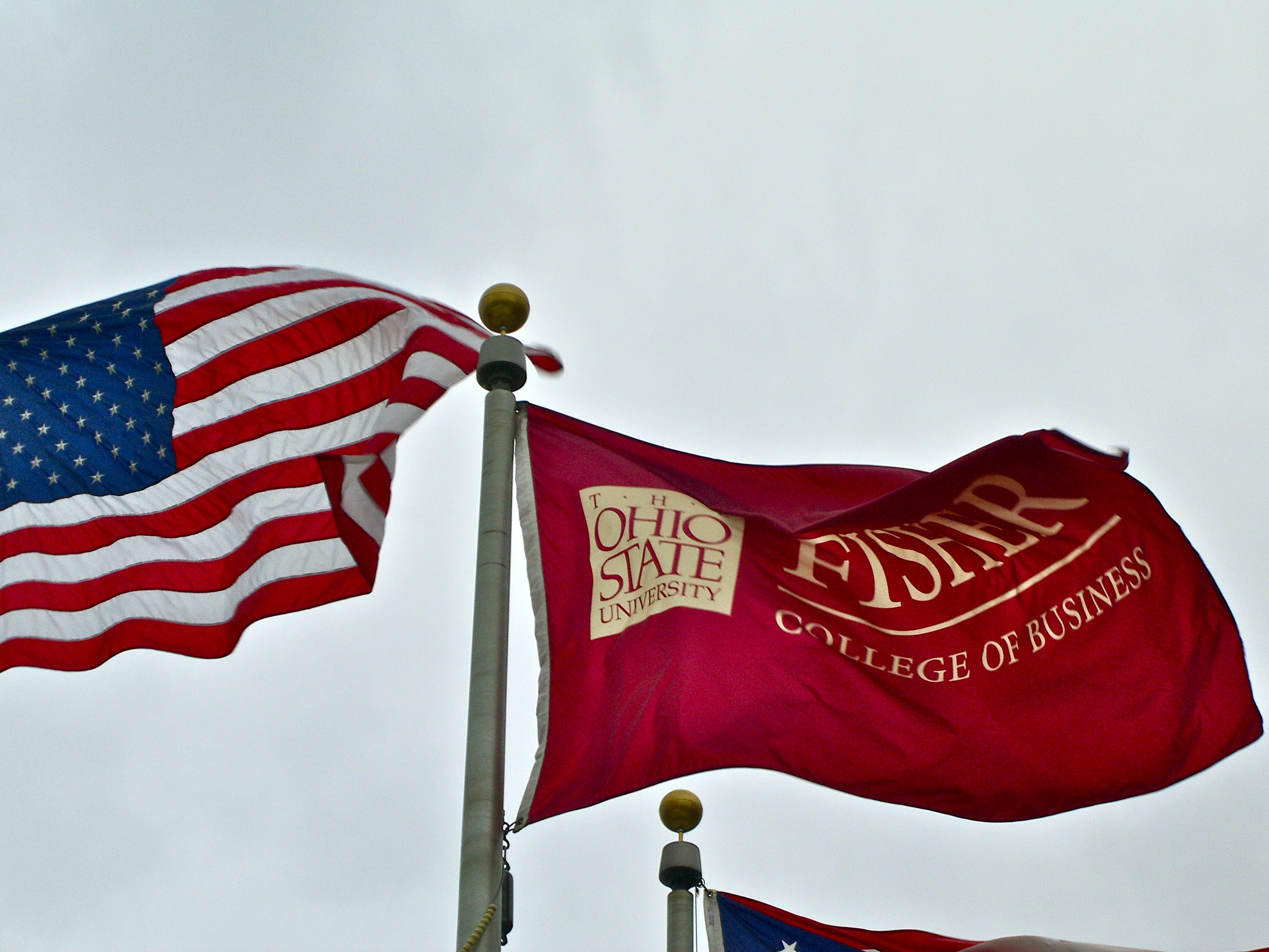
Fisher flag (2005)

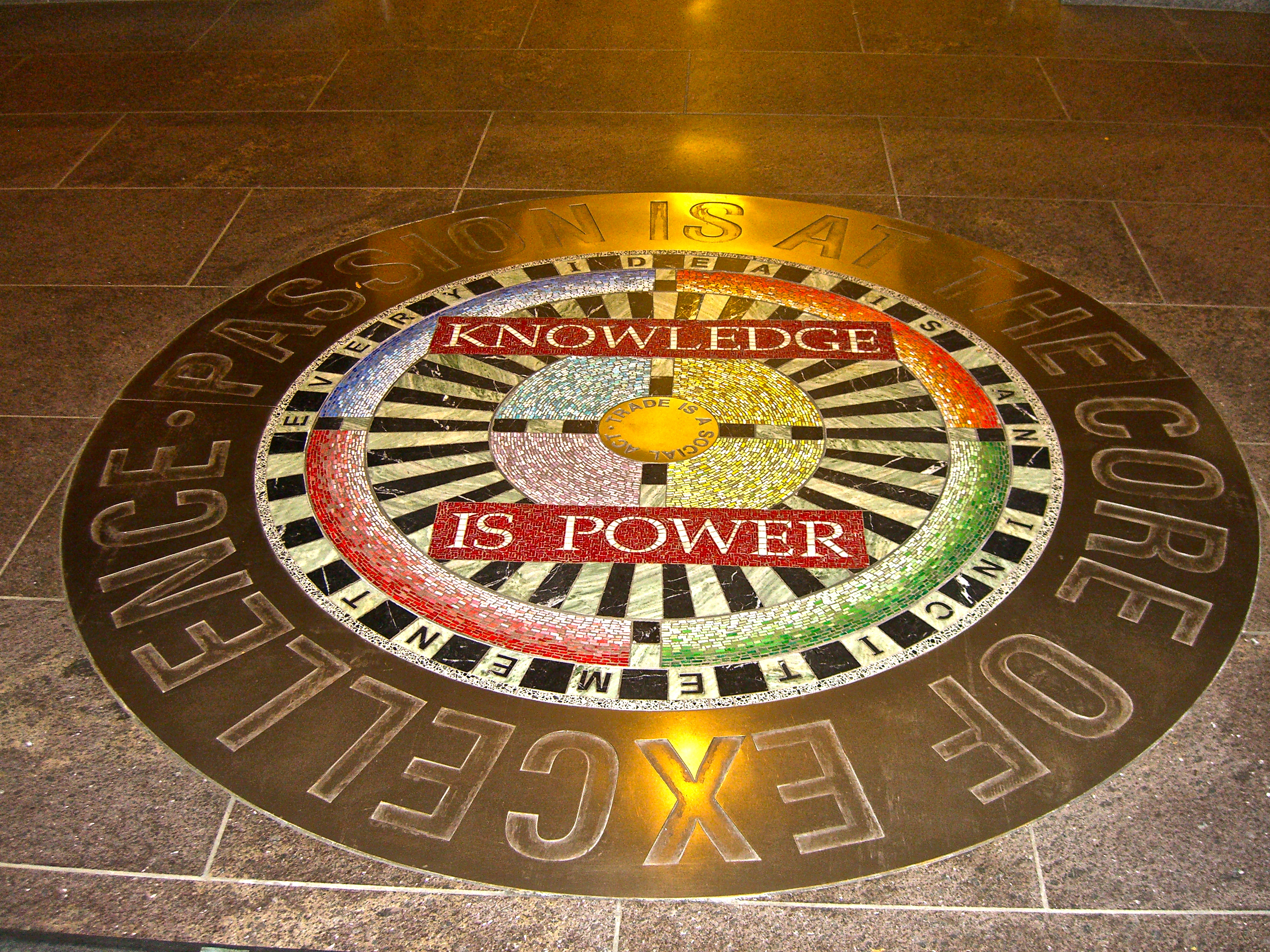
Fisher seal (2005)

== See also ==
- List of business schools in the United States
- List of colleges and universities in Ohio
- List of United States business school rankings
