= Roger Blackwell =

American marketing expert

Roger Blackwell is an American marketing expert and public speaker. He has served on the board of directors for multiple companies, most prominently Max & Erma's Restaurant, Inc., Abercrombie & Fitch, and Worthington Foods. Blackwell was a long-time marketing professor at Ohio State University and has also taught at Stanford University, Cape Town University in South Africa, and Guelph University in Canada. Sales and Marketing Executives International named him an Outstanding Marketing Professor in America. He is known for his model of the consumer decision-making process.

Blackwell has published more than twenty-five books and research reports. His most notable publications include:

- Consumer Behavior, 10th edition (he is a co-author); a textbook used in several languages internationally.
- Brands That Rock on the interaction of rock and roll and branding strategy.
- From Mind to Market, which discusses transforming supply chains into demand chains.
- Customers Rule! which contains suggestions and solutions for online businesses.
- From the Edge of the World on global marketing strategies.

He published a major report with Dr. Tom Williams, Consumer-Driven Health Care, describing how to use HSAs to reduce health care costs, and has published over 100 articles in multiple scholarly and trade journals.

In 1999, Worthington Foods discussed a possible merger with the Kellogg Company where Blackwell served as a board member. The stock price of Worthington dropped to half its eventual sale price. 6,000 people had bought Worthington Foods shares, including hundreds of associates of Worthington directors and employees. Two of the shareholders were an employee of Roger's consulting firm and her husband, who bought additional shares in the IRA accounts. Roger Blackwell and the two employees were convicted of insider trading. Blackwell received a six-year prison sentence and a fine of one million dollars. Blackwell maintains his innocence, believing his policy of not commenting about board meetings was the appropriate response to people who asked about the company. Today, Blackwell is a frequent speaker at corporate seminars and university classes on behavioral economics, marketing, and ethics.
